= Tanaka =

- Pronunciation: Tanaka

Origin
- Origin: Japanese
- Meaning: varies
- Region of origin: Japan

Tanaka (たなか) is the fourth most common Japanese surname. It is typically written with the kanji for ricefield & middle (田中). Less common variants include many & middle (多中), many & relationship (多仲), another & middle (他中), shelf & low (棚下), shelf & summer (棚夏) and many & name & congratulation (多名賀).

== People with the surname ==
- Tanaka (musician) (たなか; born 1998), Japanese musician formerly known as Boku no Lyric no Bōyomi
- Aimi Tanaka (田中 あいみ; born 1992), Japanese voice actress
- Akira Tanaka (田中 章; born 1942), Japanese hurdler
- Anna Tanaka (田中 杏奈; born 2005), Japanese singer and model, member of girl group MEOVV
- Ao Tanaka (田中 碧; born 1998), Japanese footballer
- Asuna Tanaka (田中 明日菜; born 1988), Japanese women's footballer
- Atomu Tanaka (田中 亜土夢; born 1987), Japanese footballer
- Atsuko Tanaka (disambiguation), multiple people
- Ayumi Tanaka (born 1986), Japanese pianist and composer
- Bansen Tanaka (田中 万川; 1912–1988), Japanese aikidoka
- Chie Tanaka (田中 千絵; born 1981), Japanese model and actress
- Tanaka Chigaku (田中 智學; 1861–1939), Japanese Buddhist scholar and preacher
- Chikage Tanaka (田中 千景; born 1973), Japanese speed skater
- Tanaka Chikao (田中 千禾夫; 1905–1995), Japanese playwright and dramatist
- Tanaka Chōbei (田中 長兵衛), Japanese merchant
- Chōtoku Tanaka (田中 長徳; born 1947), Japanese photographer
- Chōzaburō Tanaka (田中 長三郎; 1885–1976), Japanese botanist and mycologist
- Daijiro Tanaka (田中 大二郎; born 1988), Japanese baseball player
- Daiki Tanaka (田中 大貴; born 1991), Japanese basketball player
- Dean Tanaka, the birth name of Dean Cain (born 1966), American actor
- Eiichi Tanaka (田中 英一; born 1941), Japanese Nordic combined skier
- Eiichi Tanaka (1901–1980), Japanese police officer and politician
- Eiko Tanaka (田中 栄子), Japanese anime producer
- Eizō Tanaka (田中 栄三; 1886–1968), Japanese film director, screenwriter, and actor
- Elly Tanaka (born 1965), American biochemist
- Eri Tanaka (たなか えり; born 1977), Japanese actress and voice actress
- Eugenia Tanaka (born 1987), Indonesian-born Australian badminton player
- Evelyn Tanaka, Canadian politician
- Tanaka Fujimaro (田中 不二麿; 1845–1909), Japanese statesman and educator
- Fumiaki Tanaka (田中 史朗; born 1985), Japanese rugby union player
- Fumon Tanaka (田中 普門; born 1943), Japanese martial artist
- Gary A. Tanaka (born 1943), Japanese-American businessman and philanthropist
- Ginnosuke Tanaka (田中 銀之助; 1873–1933), Japanese rugby union player
- Tanaka Giichi (田中 義一; 1864–1929), Japanese general, politician, and Prime Minister of Japan
- Haruko Tanaka, American artist and filmmaker
- Haruo Tanaka (田中 春男; 1912–1992), Japanese actor
- Hayuma Tanaka (田中 隼磨; born 1982), Japanese footballer
- Hidekazu Tanaka (田中 秀和; born 1987), Japanese composer and arranger
- Hidemichi Tanaka (田中 秀道; born 1971), Japanese golfer
- Hidemitsu Tanaka (田中 英光; 1913–1949), Japanese novelist
- Hideo Tanaka (disambiguation), multiple people
- Hideyuki Tanaka (田中 秀幸; born 1950), Japanese voice actor
- Hikaru Tanaka (田中 光; born 1972), Japanese gymnast
- Hime Tanaka (田中ヒメ), Japanese singer and HimeHina Virtual YouTuber duo
- Hiroaki Tanaka (田中 洋明; born 1979), Japanese footballer
- Hitomi Tanaka (田中 瞳, born 1986), Japanese nude and former pornographic actress
- Hirokazu Tanaka (田中 宏和; born 1957), Japanese composer and musician
- Hiroki Tanaka (田中 寛己; born 1991), Japanese footballer
- Hiromasa Tanaka (田中 宏昌; born 1981), Japanese decathlete
- Hiromichi Tanaka (田中 弘道; born 1962), Japanese video game developer, producer, director and designer
- Hiroshi Tanaka (athlete) (田中 弘; born 1915, date of death unknown), Japanese high jumper
- Hiroshi Tanaka (field hockey) (田中 博司; born 1941), Japanese field hockey player
- Hiroshi Tanaka (figure skater) (田中 衆史; born 1972), Japanese figure skater
- Hiroto Tanaka (田中 裕人; born 1990), Japanese footballer
- Hiroyasu Tanaka (田中 浩康; born 1982), Japanese baseball player
- Hisakazu Tanaka (田中 久一; 1889–1947), Japanese general
- Hisao Tanaka, also known as Martin Tanaka (died 1991), American professional wrestler
- Tanaka Hisashige (田中 久重; 1799–1891), Japanese rangaku scholar, engineer and inventor
- Hisayoshi Tanaka (田中 久喜; born 1979), Japanese swimmer
- Ichimatsu Tanaka (田中 一松; 1895–1983), Japanese academic, art historian and curator
- Ikko Tanaka (田中 一光; 1930–2002), Japanese graphic designer
- Issei Tanaka (田仲 一成; 1932/1933–2025), Japanese writer
- Tanaka Isson (田中 一村), born Tanaka Jun (1908–1977), Japanese Nihonga painter
- Izuki Tanaka (田中 泉樹; born 1992), Japanese field hockey player
- Janice Tanaka, American artist
- Janis Tanaka (born 1963), American musician
- Jeffrey S. Tanaka (1958–1992), American psychologist and statistician
- Jin Tanaka (田中 仁; born 1976), Japanese screenwriter
- Jiro Tanaka (田中 次郎; 1917–2017), Japanese mechanical engineer
- Jujiro Tanaka (田中 重次郎; born 1947), Japanese rower
- Jun Tanaka (disambiguation), multiple people
- Junko Tanaka (田中 順子; born 1973), Japanese synchronized swimmer
- Junya Tanaka (田中 順也; born 1987), Japanese footballer
- Kakuei Tanaka (田中 角栄; 1918–1993), Japanese politician and Prime Minister of Japan
- Kan Tanaka (田中 完), Japanese voice actor
- Kane Tanaka (田中カ子; 1903–2022), oldest verified Japanese person ever
- Karen Tanaka (田中 カレン; born 1961), Japanese composer
- Kazuhiro Tanaka (田中 一弘; born 1970), Japanese drifting driver
- Karlee Tanaka (born 2003), American singer-songwriter and dancer
- Kazuhiro Tanaka (pentathlete) (田中 和宏; born 1936), Japanese modern pentathlete
- Kazuhito Tanaka (田中 和仁; born 1985), Japanese gymnast
- Kazuki Tanaka (baseball) (田中 和基; born 1994), Japanese baseball player
- Kazuki Tanaka (footballer) (田中 和樹; born 2000), Japanese footballer
- Kazunari Tanaka (田中 一成; 1967–2016), Japanese voice actor
- Kazunori Tanaka (田中 和徳; born 1949), Japanese politician
- Kazuo Tanaka, Japanese engineer
- Kei Tanaka (田中 圭; born 1984), Japanese actor
- Keiji Tanaka (田中 刑事; born 1994), Japanese figure skater
- Keishu Tanaka (田中 慶秋; 1938–2022), Japanese politician
- Keita Tanaka (田中 恵太; born 1989), Japanese footballer
- Ken Tanaka (actor) (田中 健; born 1951), Japanese actor
- Kengo Tanaka (田中 謙吾; born 1989), Japanese footballer
- Kenichi Tanaka, Japanese mixed martial artist
- Kenjiro Tanaka (田中 健二朗; born 1989), Japanese baseball player
- Kenneth K. Tanaka (born 1947), Japanese-born American Buddhist writer
- Kensuke Tanaka (田中 賢介; born 1981), Japanese baseball player
- Kenta Tanaka (田中 健太; born 1988), Japanese field hockey player
- Kinuyo Tanaka (田中 絹代; 1909–1977), Japanese actress and director
- Kishio Tanaka (田中 毅司雄; born 1946), Japanese swimmer
- Kohei Tanaka (disambiguation), multiple people
- Kohsuke Tanaka (田中 広輔; born 1989), Japanese baseball player
- Koichi Tanaka (田中 耕一; born 1959), Japanese chemist
- Koichi Tanaka (fighter) (born 1971), Japanese mixed martial artist
- Koji Tanaka (田中 孝司; born 1955), Japanese footballer and manager
- Kōjō Tanaka (田中 光常; 1924–2016), Japanese photographer
- Koki Tanaka (田中 聖; born 1985), Japanese singer-songwriter, actor and idol
- Kōki Tanaka (artist) (田中 功起; born 1975), Japanese videographer
- Komimasa Tanaka (田中 小実昌; 1925–2000), Japanese writer and translator
- Kosei Tanaka (田中 恒成, born 1995), Japanese boxer
- Kōtarō Tanaka (disambiguation), multiple people
- Kotono Tanaka (田中 琴乃; born 1991), Japanese rhythmic gymnast
- Kunie Tanaka (田中 邦衛; 1932–2021), Japanese actor
- Kunihiko Tanaka (田中 久仁彦; born 1970), Japanese manga artist and character designer
- Luana Tanaka (born 1989), Brazilian actress
- Machi Tanaka (田中 真知; born 1983), Japanese long-distance runner
- Makiko Tanaka (田中 眞紀子; born 1944) Japanese politician
- Makoto Tanaka (田中 誠; born 1975), Japanese footballer
- Mamiko Tanaka (田中 真美子; born 1996), Japanese basketball player
- Manami Tanaka (田中 真奈美; born 1989), Japanese voice actress
- Marcio Tanaka (born 1980), Japanese-Brazilian baseball player
- Marcus Tulio Tanaka (born 1981) Brazilian-born Japanese footballer
- Mari Tanaka (田中 麻里; born 1987), Japanese tennis player
- Masaaki Tanaka (田中 正明; 1911–2006), Japanese writer
- Masahiko Tanaka (disambiguation), multiple people
- Masahiro Tanaka (田中 将大; born 1988), Japanese baseball player
- Masako Tanaka, known as Mineko Iwasaki (born 1949), Japanese geisha
- Masami Tanaka (田中 雅美; born 1979), Japanese swimmer
- Masashi Tanaka (田中 政志; born 1962), Japanese manga artist
- Masato Tanaka (田中 正人; born 1973), Japanese professional wrestler
- Masayuki Tanaka (田中 昌之; born 1951), Japanese singer
- Mayumi Tanaka (田中 真弓; born 1955), Japanese voice actress
- Meca Tanaka (田中 メカ), Japanese manga artist
- Michiko Tanaka (田中 路子; 1909–1988), Japanese singer and actress
- Michinori Tanaka (田中 路教; born 1990), Japanese mixed martial artist
- Miho Tanaka (田中 美保; born 1976), Japanese badminton player
- Miho Tanaka (model) (田中 美保; born 1983), Japanese model, television personality and actress
- Miki Tanaka (田中 美衣; born 1987), Japanese judoka
- Mikiyasu Tanaka (田中 幹保; born 1955), Japanese volleyball player and coach
- Miku Tanaka (田中 美久; born 2001), Japanese idol
- Min Tanaka (田中 泯; born 1945), Japanese dancer and actor
- Mina Tanaka (田中 美南; born 1994), Japanese women's footballer
- Mina Tanaka (luger) (田中 三奈; born 1971), Japanese luger
- Minami Tanaka (田中 美海; born 1996), Japanese voice actress
- Minami Tanaka (announcer) (田中 みな実; born 1986), Japanese announcer
- Mineko Tanaka (田中 美音子; born 1975), Japanese handball player
- Minoru Tanaka (disambiguation), multiple people
- Misako Tanaka (田中 美佐子; born 1959), Japanese actress
- Misato Tanaka (田中 美里; born 1977), Japanese actress
- Mitsu Tanaka (田中 美津; born 1945), Japanese feminist and writer
- Mitsuteru Tanaka (田中 光輝; born 1971), Japanese cyclist
- Miyako Tanaka (田中 京; born 1967), Japanese synchronized swimmer
- Nanae Tanaka (田中 奈々絵; born 1975), Japanese fencer
- Naoki Tanaka (disambiguation), multiple people
- Noboru Tanaka (田中 登; 1937–2006), Japanese film director
- Noboru Tanaka (field hockey) (田中 昇; 1912-?), Japanese field hockey player
- Nobuo Tanaka (田中 伸男; born 1950), Japanese former executive director of the International Energy Agency
- Nobutaka Tanaka (田中 信孝; born 1971), Japanese footballer
- Nobuyuki Tanaka (田中 伸幸), Japanese economic botanist
- Norio Tanaka (田中 法生), Japanese aquatic botanist
- Nozomi Tanaka (田中 希実; born 1999), Japanese long-distance runner
- Pat Tanaka (born 1961), American professional wrestler
- Professor Tanaka (1930–2000), American professional wrestler
- Paul Tanaka American law enforcement officer and politician
- Raishō Tanaka (田中頼璋; 1868–1940), Japanese painter
- Raizō Tanaka (田中 頼三; 1892–1969), Japanese admiral
- Reina Tanaka (田中 れいな; born 1989), Japanese singer
- Rena Tanaka (田中 麗奈; born 1980), Japanese actress and television personality
- Rie Tanaka (田中 理恵; born 1979), Japanese singer and voice actress
- Rie Tanaka (gymnast) (田中 理恵; born 1987), Japanese artistic gymnast
- Riku Tanaka (田中 陸; born 1999), Japanese footballer
- Ritsuko Tanaka (田中 律子; born 1971), Japanese actress, television personality and singer
- Romeo Tanaka (田中 ロミオ; born 1973), Japanese writer and artist
- Ronald Phillip Tanaka (1944–2007), Japanese-American poet and editor
- Ryo Tanaka (田中 遼; born 1987), Japanese ice hockey player
- Ryohei Tanaka (1933–2019), Japanese artist
- Ryōichi Tanaka (田中 亮一; born 1947), Japanese voice actor
- Ryōko Tanaka (田中 涼子; born 1973), Japanese voice actress
- Ryosei Tanaka (田中 良生; born 1963), Japanese politician
- Ryūkichi Tanaka (田中 隆吉; 1896–1972), Japanese general
- Sakai Tanaka (田中 宇; born 1961), Japanese journalist
- Sakuji Tanaka, Japanese businessman
- Sara Tanaka (born 1978), American actress
- Satoko Tanaka (田中 聡子; born 1942), Japanese swimmer
- Satoshi Tanaka (田中 聡; born 2002), Japanese footballer
- Seigi Tanaka (田中 正義; born 1994), Japanese baseball player
- Seiichi Tanaka (田中 誠一; born 1943), Japanese taiko player
- Sendai Tanaka (田中 繊大; born 1972), Japanese boxing trainer
- Setsuji Tanaka (田中 節治; 1909–2001), Japanese rower
- Shelley Tanaka, Canadian editor, author, translator, and writing teacher
- Shigeho Tanaka (田中 茂穂; 1878–1974), Japanese ichthyologist and professor of zoology
- Shigeki Tanaka (田中 茂樹; 1931–2022), Japanese long-distance runner
- Shiho Tanaka (田中 志穗; born 1992), Japanese badminton player
- Shiho Tanaka (judoka) (田中 志歩; born 1998), Japanese judoka
- Shinako Tanaka (田中 姿子; born 1975), Japanese beach volleyball player
- Tanaka Shinbei (田中 新兵衛; 1832–1863), Japanese samurai and assassin
- Shingai Tanaka (1942–2007), Japanese calligrapher
- Shinichi Tanaka (ski jumper) (田中 信一; born 1959), Japanese ski jumper
- Shin'ichi Tanaka (photographer) (田中 新一), Japanese photographer
- Shinji Tanaka (田中 真二; born 1960), Japanese footballer and manager
- Shizuichi Tanaka (田中 静壱; 1887–1945), Japanese general
- Sho Tanaka (田中 翔; born 1989), Japanese professional wrestler
- Sho Tanaka (footballer) (田中 憧; born 1994), Japanese footballer
- Shohé Tanaka (田中 正平; 1862–1945), Japanese physicist, music theorist, and inventor
- Tanaka Shōsuke (田中 勝助), 17th-century Japanese merchant and explorer
- Shōzō Tanaka (田中 正造; 1841–1913), Japanese politician and conservationist
- Shun Tanaka (田中 舜; born 1988), Japanese footballer
- Shunichi Tanaka (田中 俊一; born 1987), Japanese footballer
- Shunta Tanaka (baseball) (田中 俊太; born 1993), Japanese baseball player
- Shunta Tanaka (footballer) (田中 駿汰; born 1997), Japanese footballer
- Shusei Tanaka (田中 秀征; born 1940), Japanese politician
- Shuta Tanaka (田中 秀太; born 1977), Japanese baseball player
- Shuto Tanaka (田中 秀人; born 1985), Japanese footballer
- Soichi Tanaka (田中 奏一; born 1989), Japanese footballer
- Sōichirō Tanaka (footballer) (田中 総一郎; born 1993), Japanese footballer
- Sōichirō Tanaka (voice actor) (田中 総一郎; born 1964), Japanese voice actor
- Soshi Tanaka (田中 総司; born 1982), Japanese figure skater
- Sumie Tanaka (田中 澄江; 1908–2000), Japanese screenwriter and playwright
- Takashi Tanaka, a.k.a. Banjō Ginga (born 1948), Japanese voice actor
- Takahiro Tanaka (disambiguation), multiple people
- Takako Tanaka (田中 貴子), Japanese voice actress
- Tamami Tanaka (田中 珠美; born 1975), Japanese biathlete
- Tatsuya Tanaka (disambiguation), multiple people
- Teisuke Tanaka (田中 楨助; 1937–2015), Japanese motorcycle racer
- Terukazu Tanaka (田中 輝和,; born 1985), Japanese footballer
- Teruki Tanaka (田中 輝希; born 1992), Japanese footballer
- Terumi Tanaka (田中 煕巳; born 1932), Japanese anti-nuclear and anti-war activist
- Teruyo Tanaka (田中 照代; born 1959), Japanese Paralympic athlete
- Tetsushi Tanaka (田中 哲司; born 1966), Japanese actor
- Tia Tanaka (born 1987), Indonesian-born American pornographic actress
- Tetsuya Tanaka (disambiguation), multiple people
- Togo Tanaka (1916–2009), American journalist and newspaper editor
- Tokutarō Tanaka (田中 徳太郎; 1909–1989), Japanese photographer
- Tokuzō Tanaka (田中 徳三; 1920–2007), Japanese film director
- Tommy Tanaka, Guam politician
- Tomohiro Tanaka (disambiguation), multiple people
- Tomoko Tanaka (田中 智子; born 1958), Japanese ice dancer
- Tomomi Tanaka (田中 智美; born 1988), Japanese long-distance runner
- Tomoyuki Tanaka (田中 友幸), Japanese film producer
- Torahiko Tanaka (田中 寅彦; born 1957), Japanese shogi player
- Tanaka Tosa (田中 土佐; 1820–1868), Japanese samurai
- Toshiaki Tanaka (田中 利明; 1935–1998), Japanese table tennis player
- Toshibumi Tanaka (田中 敏文; 1911–1982), Japanese politician
- Toshimitsu Tanaka (田中 利光; 1930–2020), Japanese composer
- Toshiya Tanaka (disambiguation), multiple people
- Toshiyuki Tanaka (田中 利幸; born 1985), Japanese equestrian
- Tsuneo Tanaka (田中 常雄), Japanese diplomat
- Tsunetoshi Tanaka (田中 恒利; died 2014), Japanese politician
- Tsutomu Tanaka (田中 勉; born 1939), Japanese baseball player
- Wataru Tanaka (田中 渉; born 2000), Japanese footballer
- Yasuhiro Tanaka (disambiguation), multiple people
- Yasukazu Tanaka (田中 雍和; born 1933), Japanese footballer
- Yasuo Tanaka (disambiguation), multiple people
- Yasushi Tanaka (田中 保; 1886–1941), Japanese artist
- Yasushin Tanaka (田中 保伸; born 1945), Japanese ice hockey player
- Yōji Tanaka (田中 要次; born 1968), Japanese actor
- Yoko Tanaka (田中 陽; born 1993), Japanese women's footballer
- Yoshikazu Tanaka (田中 良和; born 1977), Japanese businessman
- Yoshiki Tanaka (田中 芳樹; born 1952), Japanese novelist
- Yoshiko Tanaka (田中 好子; 1956–2011), Japanese actress
- Yoshiko Tanaka (table tennis) (田中 良子), Japanese table tennis player
- Tanaka Yoshio (田中 芳男; 1838–1916), Japanese civil servant and naturalist
- Yoshio Tanaka (swimmer) (田中 純夫; born 1930), Japanese swimmer
- Yudai Tanaka (footballer, born 1988) (田中 雄大), Japanese footballer
- Yudai Tanaka (footballer, born 1995) (田中 雄大), Japanese footballer
- Yūichi Tanaka (田中 悠一; born 1985), Japanese shogi player
- Yuji Tanaka (田中 裕二; born 1965), Japanese comedian
- Yuka Tanaka (born 1974), Japanese tennis player
- Yuki Tanaka (disambiguation), multiple people
- Yukinori Tanaka (田中 穂徳; born 1966), Japanese swimmer
- Yukio Tanaka (disambiguation), multiple people
- Yūko Tanaka (田中 裕子; born 1955), Japanese actress
- Yurie Tanaka (田中 友理恵; born 1989), Japanese biathlete
- Yūsuke Tanaka (disambiguation), multiple people

== Fictional characters ==
- Lady Tanaka, is the main antagonist in the movie "The Punisher"(1989)
- Tanaka, a character in the manga series Black Butler
- Tanaka, the household servant in Full Moon o Sagashite
- Tanaka, the Usami household butler in Junjo Romantica
- Tanaka, from Kimi ni Todoke
- Tanaka, a character in the light novel series Mayoi Neko Overrun
- Tanaka, from Tanaka-kun is Always Listless
- Mr. Tanaka, from F-Zero GX
- Mr. Tanaka, from Sonic X
- Mr. Tanaka, from the anime Gantz
- President Tanaka, from Persona 3
- Aiko Tanaka from Oyasumi Punpun
- Asuka Tanaka, from Sound! Euphonium
- David Tanaka, a character in the soap opera Neighbours
- Drew Tanaka from The Heroes of Olympus and The Kane Chronicles
- Gundham Tanaka from Danganronpa 2: Goodbye Despair
- Holly Tanaka, a character in the video Game Halo 5: Guardians
- Ichiro Tanaka, character from Medal of Honor: Rising Sun
- Isuro Tanaka, from the film Major League II
- Tanaka Kazuya, from School Rumble
- Ken Tanaka, a character in the television series Glee
- Kida Tanaka, from Fear & Hunger 2: Termina
- Koyuki Tanaka, from SBK: Snowboard Kids
- Leo Tanaka, a character in the soap opera Neighbours
- Mabel Tanaka, main protagonist in the Pixar animated film Hoppers
- Opal Tanaka, a Marvel Comics character
- Ryūnosuke Tanaka from Haikyū!!
- Shinichiro Tanaka, from Battle Royale (film, Special Edition)
- Shinji Tanaka, from Yakuza (video game)
- Souichirou Tanaka, character from Genshiken
- Taro Tanaka, from Taro the Space Alien (Uchūjin Tanaka Tarō)
- Tiger Tanaka, from the James Bond novel and film You Only Live Twice
- Tom Tanaka, from Durarara!
- Lt. Yoshi Tanaka from Magnum, P.I.
- Yukio "Koyuki" Tanaka, main character of the manga series BECK
- Tricia Tanaka, featured in the episode Tricia Tanaka is Dead from the TV show Lost (2004 TV series)

== See also ==
- Keiko Tanaka-Ikeda (田中-池田 敬子; born 1933), Japanese gymnast
- Kumiko Tanaka-Ishii (born 1969), Japanese linguist
- Tadao Tannaka (淡中 忠郎; 1908–1986), Japanese mathematician
