= List of calligraphers =

This is a list of calligraphers.

== Calligraphers ==
- Reza Abbasi (c. 1565 – 1635), Persian miniaturist
- Aizu Yaichi (1881–1956), Japanese poet, calligrapher and historian
- Mimmi Bähr (1844–1923), Finnish inventor and calligrapher
- Arthur Baker (1930–2016), American calligrapher
- Pat Blair (fl. 2000s), White House chief calligrapher
- Timothy Botts
- Cai Yong (c. 132–192), Chinese calligrapher
- Ralph Waddell Douglass (1895–1971), American commercial artist
- Hattat Aziz Efendi (1871–1934), Ottoman later Turkish calligrapher
- Karl-Erik Forsberg (1914–1995), Swedish calligrapher, type designer and artist
- Tim Gaze
- Richard Gething (c. 1585 – c. 1652), English calligrapher
- Jenny Hunter Groat (1929–2013), American dancer and artist
- Mi Guangjiang (born 1963), Chinese expert in Islamic calligraphy
- Robert Haas (1898–1997), Austrian-American calligrapher, artist and collector
- Han Sŏkpong (1543–1605), mid-Joseon period Korean calligrapher
- Mir Emad Hassani (1554–1615), celebrated Persian calligrapher
- Karlgeorg Hoefer (1914–2000), German calligrapher and typographer
- Huang Shi An (1903–1990), Chinese calligraphy artist
- Huang Tingjian (1045–1105), Chinese calligrapher, painter and poet
- Fay King Imhoff (1904–1989), White House calligrapher
- Ingen Ryūki (1592–1673), Chinese poet, calligrapher and monk
- Thomas Ingmire (born 1942), American calligrapher
- Shinjō Itō (1906–1989), Japanese Buddhist teacher
- Donald Jackson (born 1938), British calligrapher and official scribe to the Crown Office
- Jang Il-soon (1928–1994), South Korean educator and activist
- Jiang Kui (c. 1155–1221), Chinese poet, composer and calligrapher
- Edward Johnston (1872–1944), British craftsman and "father of modern calligraphy"
- Kim Eung-heon (1927–2007), South Korean calligrapher
- Aslam Kiratpuri (born 1951), Indian journalist, artist and calligrapher
- Rudolf Koch (1876–1934), German type designer
- Liang Xiao Ping (born 1959), Australian Chinese calligrapher
- Liu Gongquan (778—865), Chinese calligrapher and politician
- Louis Madarasz (1859–1910), American calligrapher
- Hassan Massoudy (born 1944), Iraqi painter and calligrapher
- Mi Fu (1051–1107), Chinese painter, poet and calligrapher
- Arnold Möller (1581–1655), German calligrapher
- Ono no Michikaze (894–966), Japanese calligrapher
- Brody Neuenschwander (born 1958), Belgian calligrapher and artist
- Konoe Nobutada (1565–1614), Japanese courtier
- Ouyang Xun (557–641), Chinese calligrapher, politician and writer
- Mishkín-Qalam (1826–1912), Persian Baháʼí apostle and calligrapher
- Qu Leilei (born 1951), Chinese contemporary artist
- Jalil Rasouli (born 1947), Iranian artist and calligrapher
- Satyajit Ray (1921–1992), Indian film director
- Lloyd J. Reynolds (1902–1978), American calligrapher and professor
- Onoe Saishu (1876–1957), Japanese poet, educator and calligrapher
- Luigi Serafini (born 1949), Italian artist and designer
- Shen Yinmo (1883–1971), Chinese poet and calligrapher
- Platt Rogers Spencer (1800–1864), the originator of Spencerian penmanship
- Sun Guoting (646–691), Chinese artist known for cursive calligraphy
- Soraya Syed (born 1976), English Islamic calligrapher
- Christophe Szpajdel (born 1970), Belgian heavy metal calligrapher
- Mir Ali Tabrizi (14th century), Persian inventor of Nastaliq calligraphy
- Shingai Tanaka (1942–2007), Japanese calligrapher and shodō artist
- Tsai Ding Hsin (1920–2015), Taiwanese master of Chinese calligraphy
- Wang Xianzhi (344–386), Chinese calligrapher
- Wang Xizhi (c. 303–361), Chinese politician, general and calligrapher
- Osman Waqialla (1925−2007), Sudanese painter and calligrapher
- Sheila Waters (1929–2022), British calligrapher and teacher
- Wei Shuo (272 – 349), Chinese calligrapherand pioneer of regular script
- Hermann Zapf (1918–2015), German type designer
- Yan Zhenqing (709–784), Chinese calligrapher, general and politician.
- Zhang Xu (fl. 8th century), Chinese calligrapher and poet
- Zhao Mengfu (1254–1322), Chinese calligrapher, painter and scholar
- Zhong Hui (225–264), Chinese calligrapher, essayist, general and politician
