= Minoru =

- Gender: Male

Origin
- Origin: Japanese
- Meaning: Different meanings depending on the kanji used

Minoru is a masculine Japanese given name. Notable people with the name include:

- Minoru Arakawa (荒川 實; born 1946), Japanese former president of Nintendo of America
- Minoru Araki (荒木 實; 1928–2010), Japanese painter and industrial designer
- Minoru Asada (born 1953), Japanese engineer
- Minoru Betsuyaku (別役 実; 1937–2020), Japanese postwar playwrights, novelists, and essayists
- Minoru Chiaki (千秋 実; 1917–1999), Japanese actor
- Minoru Fujita (藤田 ミノル; born 1977), Japanese professional wrestler
- Minoru Furuya (古谷 実; born 1972), Japanese manga artist
- Minoru Genda (源田 実; 1904–1989), Japanese naval general
- Minoru Hanafusa (花房 稔; born 1996), Japanese footballer
- Minoru Hara (原 實; 1930–2021), Japanese writer, Indologist, philologist, and a scholar
- Minoru Harada (原田 稔; born 1941), Japanese Buddhist leader
- Minoru Hata (畑 実; born 1989), Japanese footballer
- Minoru Hatashita (1919-1996), Canadian judoka
- Minoru Higa (比嘉 稔; born 1941), Japanese president and Grandmaster of the Kyudokan School
- Minoru Hirai (平井 稔; 1903–1998), Japanese martial artist
- Minoru Honda (本田 実; 1913–1990), Japanese astronomer
- Minoru Iizuka (飯塚 実; 1933–2022), Japanese wrestler
- Minoru Inaba (稲葉 実; born 1951), Japanese voice actor
- Minoru Inuzuka (犬塚 稔; 1901–2007), Japanese film director and screenwriter
- Minoru Ito (disambiguation), multiple people
- Minoru Iwata (岩田 稔; born 1983), Japanese baseball pitcher
- Minoru Iwata (volleyball) (岩田 稔; born 1957), Japanese former volleyball player
- Minoru Kamata (鎌田 實; born 1948), Japanese physician, writer, and humanitarian
- Minoru Kamata (baseball) (鎌田 実; 1939–2019), Japanese professional baseball second baseman
- Minoru Kanehisa (金久 實; born 1948), Japanese bioinformatician
- Minoru Kawabata (川端 実; 1911-2001), Japanese artist
- Minoru Kawasaki (director) (河崎 実; born 1958), Japanese filmmaker
- Minoru Kawasaki (politician) (川崎 稔; born 1961), Japanese politician
- Minoru Kawawada (川和田 実; born 1952), Japanese master of Shotokan karate
- Minoru Kihara (木原 稔; born 1969), Japanese politician
- Minoru Kihara (television personality) (木原 実; born 1960), Japanese actor, voice actor, and weather forecaster
- Minoru Kimura (born 1993), Brazilian kickboxer
- Minoru Kino (木野 実; born 1945), Japanese handball player
- Minoru Kitamura (北村 稔; born 1948), Japanese historian
- Minoru Kitani (木谷 実; 1909–1975), Japanese professional Go player
- Minoru Kiuchi (城内 実; born 1965), Japanese politician and former Ministry of Foreign Affairs
- Minoru Kizawa (鬼沢 稔; born 1947), Japanese astronomer
- Minoru Kobata (小畑 穣; born 1946), Japanese footballer
- Minoru Kobayashi (小林 稔; born 1976), Japanese footballer
- Minoru Koga (古賀 穂; born 1996), Japanese badminton player
- Minoru Kojima (室姫 深; born 1968), Japanese musician
- Minoru Kubota (窪田 登; 1930–2017), Japanese weightlifter
- Minoru Kunizawa (国沢 実; born 1964), Japanese film director, screenwriter, and actor
- Minoru Kushibiki (櫛引 実; born 1967), Japanese football player
- Minoru Makihara (槙原 稔; 1930–2020), Japanese business executive
- Minoru Matsuya (松谷 穣; 1910–1995), Japanese jazz pianist
- Minoru Miki (三木 稔; 1930–2011), Japanese composer and artistic director
- Minoru Miki (cinematographer) (三木 稔; 1902–1968), Japanese cinematographer
- Minoru Minami (南 実; 1887–1948), Japanese photographer
- Minoru Misawa (三沢 実; born 1949), Japanese ice hockey player
- Minoru Mochizuki (望月 稔; 1907–2003), Japanese martial artist
- Minoru Mori (森 稔; 1934–2012), Japanese businessman
- Minoru Mukaiya (向谷 実; born 1956), Japanese musician
- Minoru Muraoka (村岡 実; 1923–2014), Japanese shakuhachi player
- Minoru Murata (村田 實; 1894–1937), Japanese film director, screenwriter, and actor
- Minoru Nagata (永田 実; 1906-????), Japanese cross-country skier
- Minoru Nakamura (中村 稔; 1938–2021), Japanese baseball player
- Minoru Nakano (中野 稔; born 1936), Japanese ice hockey player
- Minoru Niizuma (新妻 実; 1930-1998), Japanese abstract sculptor
- Minoru Nojima (野島 稔; 1945–2020), Japanese classical pianist
- Minoru Ohira (born 1950), Japanese artist
- Minoru Ōki (大木 実; 1927–2009), Japanese actor
- Minoru Okidoi (沖土居 稔; born 1965), Japanese rugby union player
- Minoru Okita (born 1951), Japanese sailor
- Minoru Ota (大田 実; 1891–1945), Japanese rear admiral
- Minoru Onoda (小野田 實; born 1937), Japanese important member of the Gutai Group's younger generation
- Minoru Ozima (born 1930), Japanese geochemist and Professor Emeritus
- Minoru Saito (斉藤 実; born 1934), Japanese solo yachtsman
- Minoru Sakata (坂田 稔; 1902–1974), Japanese photographer
- Minoru Sano (chef) (佐野 実; 1951–2014), Japanese celebrity chef
- Minoru Sano (figure skater) (佐野 稔; born 1955), Japanese former competitive figure skater
- Minoru Sasaki (佐々木 登; 1893–1961), Japanese Lieutenant General in the Imperial Japanese Army
- Minoru Shibuya (渋谷 実; 1907–1980), Japanese film director
- Minoru Shiraishi (白石 稔; born 1978), Japanese voice actor
- Minoru Shirota (代田 稔; 1899–1982), Japanese scientist/inventor
- Minoru Suganuma (菅沼 実; born 1985), Japanese former football player
- Minoru Suzuki (鈴木 実; born 1968), Japanese professional wrestler and mixed martial artist
- Minoru Suzuki (鈴木 登; 1893-????), Japanese politician
- Minoru Takarakuni (高野 実; born 1956), Japanese former sumo wrestle
- Minoru Takano (高野 実; 1901-1974), Japanese trade union leader
- Minoru Takase (高勢 実乗; 1890–1947), Japanese comedian and actor
- Minoru Takeuchi (竹内 実; born 1971), Japanese volleyball player
- Minoru Takita (滝田 実; 1912–2000), Japanese trade union leader
- Minoru N. Tamura (田村 実; 1964), Japanese botanist
- Minoru Tanaka (disambiguation), multiple people
- Minoru Tatsukawa (達川 実; born 1952), Japanese volleyball player and coach
- Minoru Terada (寺田 稔; born 1958), Japanese politician
- Minoru Tōjō (東城 穣; born 1976), Japanese football referee
- Minoru Tomita (冨田 稔; 1924–2015), Japanese mathematician
- Minoru Torihada (鳥肌 実; born 1970), Japanese comedian
- Minoru Uchida (内田 稔; 1927–2018), Japanese actor and voice actor
- Umewaka Minoru I (初世 梅若 実; 1828–1909), Japanese eading actor in the Kanze school of Noh
- Minoru Wada, American citizen who was educated in Japan, who served as an Imperial Japanese Army junior officer
- Minoru Wakasa (若狭 実; born 1951), Japanese ski jumper
- Minoru Watanabe (渡辺 実; born 1962), Japanese actor
- Minoru Yada (矢田 稔; born 1931), Japanese voice actor
- Minoru Yamamoto (山本 秀; 1912/1913–1996), Japanese classical composer
- Minoru Yamasaki (山崎 實; 1912–1986), American architect who designed the World Trade Center
- Minoru Yanagida (柳田 稔; born 1954), Japanese politician
- Minoru Yano (矢野 実), Japanese officer in the Imperial Japanese Navy
- Minoru Yasui (安井 稔; 1916–1986), American lawyer
- Minoru Yoneyama (米山 稔; 1924–2019), Japanese businessman
- Minoru Yoshida (ヨシダ ミノル; 1935–2010), Japanese painter, sculptor, and performance artist
- Minoru Yoshimura (吉村 実; born 1945), Japanese field hockey player

== Fictional characters ==
- Minoru Edajima, from the anime Onegai Teacher
- Nico Minoru, from the Marvel Comics series Runaways (comics)
- Minoru “Minnow” Ito, from the novel We Are Not Free by Traci Chee
- Minoru Kohinata, from the manga Karate Shōkōshi Kohinata Minoru by Baba Yasushi
- Minoru, from the anime film Fireworks (2017 film)
- Minoru Mineta (峰田 実), from the manga and anime My Hero Academia
- Minoru Minorikawa (御法川 実), from the original 428: Shibuya Scramble
- Minoru Kageno (影野実) (reincarnated as Cid Kagenou (シド・カゲノー) from the light novel, manga and anime The Eminence in Shadow

== See also ==
- Tokino Minoru (トキノミノル; 1948–1951), Japanese Thoroughbred racehorse
- Reine Minoru (レーヌミノル; born 2014), Japanese Thoroughbred racehorse and broodmare
