= Mutafukaz =

2017 animated film

- Theatrical release poster

Japanese name
- Kanji: ムタフカズ
Transcriptions
- Revised Hepburn: Mutafukazu
- Directed by: Shōjirō Nishimi; Guillaume "Run" Renard
- Screenplay by: Guillaume "Run" Renard
- Based on: Mutafukaz by Guillaume "Run" Renard Mutafukaz: Operation Blackhead by Team Chman
- Produced by: Anthony Roux; Eiko Tanaka; Frédéric Puech
- Starring: Orelsan; Gringe; Redouanne Harjane; Féodor Atkine; Kelly Marot
- Edited by: Ivy Buirette; Marie-Laure Vanglabeke
- Music by: The Toxic Avenger; Guillaume Houzé
- Production companies: Ankama Animations; Studio 4°C
- Distributed by: Tamasa (France); Parco (Japan)
- Release dates: June 13, 2017 (Annecy Festival); May 23, 2018 (France); October 12, 2018 (Japan)
- Running time: 94 minutes
- Countries: France; Japan
- Languages: French; Japanese; English
- Box office: $461,724

Mutafukaz (Note: An eye dialect of "mother fuckers".) (Japanese: ムタフカズ －MUTAFUKAZ－, Hepburn: Mutafukazu; released as MFKZ in some markets) is a 2017 adult animated science fiction film based on the comic series and the short film of the same name. The film was a co-production between French studio Ankama Animations and the Japanese Studio 4°C, directed by Shōjirō Nishimi and Guillaume "Run" Renard. The comic would be published in English as MFKZ by Sumerian Comics' beginning in June 2021. Mutafukaz was released in France on May 23, 2018, and in Japan on October 12, 2018. At the end of December 2022, it was added to Hulu's streaming platform.

== Plot ==
A red-haired woman carrying a baby is chased by a group of black-suited men. Some of the men are killed by a black labrador who sprouts tentacles. The woman manages to hide the baby in a dumpster before she is killed by one of the men.

22 years later, the baby is now a man named Angelino, who lives in a run-down apartment in a dystopian Los Angeles named Dark Meat City (DMC) with his friend Vinz and countless "pet" cockroaches. While making a delivery, Angelino is distracted by Luna, a beautiful young woman, and is hit by a truck. This causes Angelino to start having headaches and hallucinate. The MIB, which is led by a white-suited man named Bruce, begin pursuing Angelino. Angelino calls his friend Willy the fruitbat, and they hide in the rundown crime neighborhood of Palm Hills. Angelino and Vinz are later found again by the MIB, who engage the local gangs in a gunfight, killing people from both sides. Elsewhere, a Luchador tells his comrades about a vision he had about a potential evil they must combat.

In the restaurant they frequent, Angelino and Vinz run into Luna, who is actually working with the MIB and gets the two captured. Luna's father, Mr. K, is the leader of an alien race called Macho who have infiltrated the Earth including politicians and the police in order to eventually colonize the planet. Angelino is the child of a Macho father and a human woman which results in unpredictable and potentially powerful combinations that Mr. K wants to exploit. Mr. K tries to brainwash Angelino and convince him to kill his friend Vinz, while Luna switches sides after witnessing Angelino's past. They are rescued by the group of Luchadors who have followed Angelino's pet cockroaches that instinctively tracked Angelino down, and are joined by a scientist named Fagor who was the only one out of several kidnapped scientists working with the Macho.

Randy Crocodile, an agent of the MIB arrives at Willy's house and holds him hostage. Angelino and Vinz decide to return and Angelino rescues Willy. The Luchadores and Fagor build and launch a rocket, triggering it to snow across the country, freezing and killing all of the hidden Macho, while causing a news helicopter to crash, destroying Willy's house and killing Crocodile. Angelino, being half Macho, begins freezing, but is saved by Luna's kiss and she apologizes to him. Bruce arrives for a climactic fight against Angelino, who saves Luna from being killed and refuses to use his Macho powers. Before Bruce takes the opportunity to kill Angelino, the local gangs gun him down as revenge for previously invading their hood and for shooting their leader in the eye.

Two months later, everything goes back to "normal" with people forgetting about the incident. Vinz finally gets a job at the restaurant they frequent. Angelino writes letters to Luna who disappeared after his fight with Bruce despite not knowing where in DMC she is. Willy, who also disappeared after the fight, creates his first music single. Mr. K is shown to have survived and has set up a base on the moon, where he begins sending UFOs to potentially invade earth.

== Voice cast ==
Character	French	Japanese	English
Angelino- A down-on-his-luck young man who was born the crossbreed of a human and Macho and discovers that he has extraordinary powers that he activates when he is in high-stress situations.	Orelsan	Tsuyoshi Kusanagi	Kenn Michael
Vinz- A neurotic and cynical humanoid with a flaming skull for a head and is Angelino's best friend.	Gringe	Tokio Emoto	Vince Staples
Willy- An obnoxious and cowardly anthropomorphic orange bat with braces who is a friend of Angelino and Vinz.	Redouanne Harjane	Shinnosuke Mitsushima	Dino Andrade
Mister K- the sinister leader of the Machos and Luna's father who is interested in abducting and indoctrinating Angelino.	Féodor Atkine	Hidekatsu Shibata	Giancarlo Esposito
Luna- A young Macho woman working for Mr. K and Bruce to capture Angelino but has a change of heart over realizing that it's possible to live a better life through reading his mind. She is Angelino's love interest.	Kelly Marot	Sumire Uesaka	Dascha Polanco
Bruce Macchabée- A ruthless human hitman working for the Machos, is Mr. K's second-in-command, and is the one responsible for murdering Angelino's mother when he was an infant.	Julien Kramer	Hayato Fujii^{[ja]}	Danny Trejo
El Diablo- The leader of the luchador vigilantes who wears a demon-like mask.	Julien Kramer	Kazushi Sakuraba	Antonio Alvarez
Randy Crocodile- Bruce's violent right-hand-man.	Emmanuel Karsen	Songha^{[ja]}	Michael Chiklis
El Tigre- A cynical luchador with a tiger head instead of an actual mask.	Alain Dorval	Yuki Nakai	Jorge R. Gutierrez
Professor Fagor- a scientist who betrays the Machos and works with the luchadores to save the world.	Gilbert Lévy	Minoru Kihara	Bill Lobley
Popeye / Shakespeare- a large and imposing gangster and supposed leader of the Grapez who speaks in Shakespearian quotes.	Frantz Confiac	Songha	RZA

== Release ==
Mutafukaz had its world premiere on June 13, 2017, at the Annecy International Animation Film Festival. The film was released in France on May 23, 2018. Parco released the film in Japan on October 12, 2018. GKIDS released the English dub of the film in a limited theatrical run in the U.S. and Canada on October 11 and October 16, 2018, with an R Rating for "bloody violence, language and some sexual content", the first GKIDS release to have that rating. MFKZ was added to Hulu's streaming platform at the end of December 2022.

== Reception ==
On Rotten Tomatoes, the film has a score of 39% based on 18 reviews with an average rating of 4.90/10.
