= Carex baohuashanica =

Scientific classification
- Kingdom: Plantae
- Clade: Embryophytes
- Clade: Tracheophytes
- Clade: Spermatophytes
- Clade: Angiosperms
- Clade: Monocots
- Clade: Commelinids
- Order: Poales
- Family: Cyperaceae
- Genus: Carex
- Species: C. baohuashanica

Binomial name
- Carex baohuashanica Tang & F.T.Wang ex L.K.Dai

Species of sedge

Carex baohuashanica, also known as bao hua shan tai cao in China, is a tussock-forming perennial in the family Cyperaceae. It is endemic to south eastern parts of China.

== Description ==
The sedge has a short, woody rhizome. It has smooth, slender culms with a triangular cross-section that are typically 50 to 60 cm (20 to 24 in) in length and are often covered in red to brown coloured sheaths. It has flat, rough texture leaves that are 3 to 4 mm (0.12 to 0.16 in) in width and about the same length as the culms. The plant flowers between March and April and forms three to four flower spikes.

== Distribution ==
It is found in temperate areas of south eastern China particularly in parts of the Anhui and Jiangsu province where it is often situated in ravines.

== Taxonomy ==
The species was first described in 1994 as C. bauhuashanica in the journal Acta Phytotaxonomica et Geobotanica by the Chines botanist Lun Kai Dai. The name of the species was coined by Fa Tsuan Wang and Tsin Tang.

== See also ==
- List of Carex species
