= JPR =

JPR may stand for:

- J. P. R. Williams (1949–2024), Welsh rugby player
- Institute for Jewish Policy Research, a British think tank
- Jefferson Public Radio, headquartered in Ashland, Oregon
- Jeppiaar (1931–2016), Indian educationalist
- Ji-Paraná Airport, in Brazil
- Journal of Peace Research
- Journal of Plant Research
- Journal of Proteome Research
- Journal of Psychosomatic Research
- Judeo-Persian, a language of Iran
