= Norio Tanaka =

Norio Tanaka (田中 法生, Tanaka Norio) is an aquatic botanist at Tsukuba Botanical Garden, National Science Museum, Tokyo, Japan.

Dr. Tanaka is an expert on the family Hydrocharitaceae and Zosteraceae, and in 1997 and 2003 published a worldwide molecular phylogenies of the families.

== Colleagues ==
- Yu Ito (University of Canterbury, New Zealand)

== Publications ==
- Tanaka, Nr., H. Setoguchi and J. Murata (1997) Phylogeny of the family hydrocharitaceae inferred from rbcL and matK gene sequence data Journal of Plant Research 110: 329-337.
- Tanaka, Nr., J. Kuo, Y. Omori, M. Nakaoka and K. Aioi (2003) Phylogenetic relationships in the genera Zostera and Heterozostera (Zosteraceae) based on matK sequence data Journal of Plant Research 116: 273-279.
- Ito, Y., Nr. Tanaka and K. Uehara (2007) Inferring the origin of Potamogeton ×inbaensis (Potamogetonaceae) using nuclear and chloroplast DNA sequences. Journal of Japanese Botany 82: 20-28.
- Ito, Y., T. Ohi-Toma, Nb. Tanaka, and J. Murata (2009) New or noteworthy plant collections from Myanmar (3) Caldesia parnassifolia, Nechamandra alternifolia, Potamogeton maackianus and P. octandrus. Journal of Japanese Botany 84: 321-329.
- Ito Y., T. Ohi-Toma, J. Murata & Nr. Tanaka (2010) Hybridization and polyploidy of an aquatic plant, Ruppia (Ruppiaceae), inferred from plastid and nuclear DNA phylogenies American Journal of Botany 97: 1156-1167.
- Ito, Y. and Nr. Tanaka (2011) Hybridisation in a tropical seagrass genus, Halodule (Cymodoceaceae), inferred from plastid and nuclear DNA phylogenies. Telopea 13: 219-231
- Ito, Y., and Nr. Tanaka (2013) Additional Potamogeton hybrids from China: Evidence from a comparison of plastid trnT–trnF and nuclear ITS phylogenies. APG: Acta Phytotaxonomica et Geobotanica 64 (1): 1–14
- Ito, Y., T. Ohi-Toma, J. Murata & Nr. Tanaka (2013) Comprehensive phylogenetic analyses of the Ruppia maritima complex focusing on taxa from the Mediterranean Journal of Plant Research 126: 753-762.
- Ito, Y., T. Ohi-Toma, Nb. Tanaka, Nr. Tanaka & J. Murata (2014) New or noteworthy plant collections from Myanmar (8) Blyxa aubertii var. echinosperma, Lemna trisulca, and Najas tenuis. APG: Acta Phytotaxonomica et Geobotanica 65: xxx-xxx.
- Ito, Y., Nr. Tanaka, R. Pooma, and Nb. Tanaka (2014) DNA barcoding reveals a new record of Potamogeton distinctus (Potamogetonaceae) and its natural hybrids, P. distinctus × P. nodosus and P. distinctus × P. wrightii (P. ×malainoides) from Myanmar. Biodiversity Data Journal 2: e1073.
- Ito, Y. T. Ohi-Toma, A. V. Skriptsova, M. Sasagawa, N. Tanaka, and J. Murata (2014) Ruppia megacarpa (Ruppiaceae), new to the floras of Far East Russia, Korea, and Japan. Botanica Pacifica 3: xxx-xxx
