= Zaynu'l-Muqarrabín =

Iranian Baháʼí

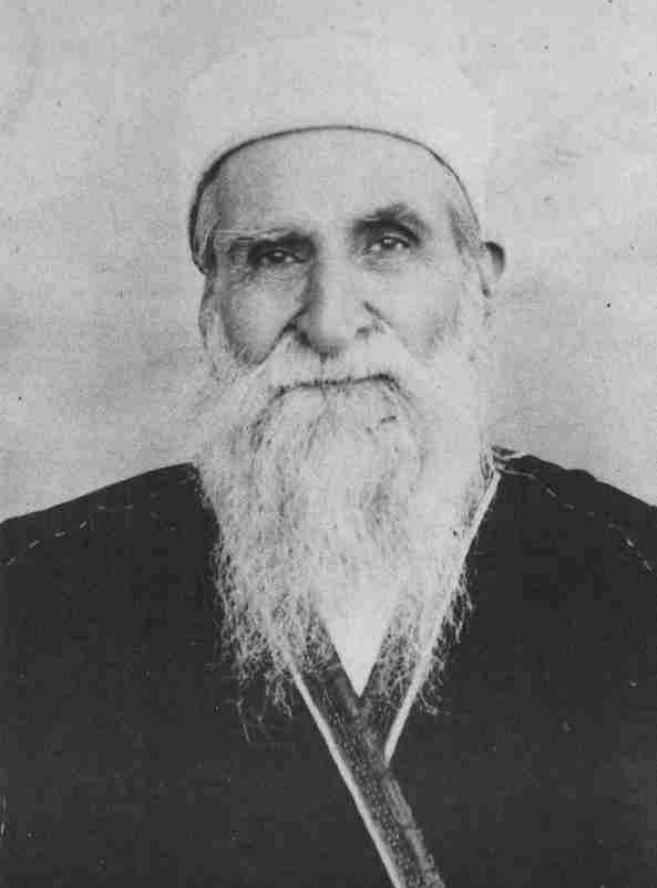
Zaynu'l-Muqarrabín

Mullá Zaynul-ʻÁbidín (May 1818 − 1903) was a prominent Iranian Baháʼí who served as a secretary to Baháʼu'lláh, was listed by Shoghi Effendi as one of nineteen Apostles of Baháʼu'lláh, and biographied by ʻAbdu'l-Bahá in Memorials of the Faithful. With a background as an Islamic jurist, he posed the clarifying legal questions to Baháʼu'lláh about the Kitáb-i-Aqdas that became the supplement "Questions and Answers" now published along with the original text. His arrangement of the Hidden Words, another major work of Baháʼu'lláh, became the numbered order that is now currently used by Baháʼís.

Zaynu'l-Muqarrabín was known for transcribing, illuminating, and copying numerous writings of Baháʼu'lláh.

Baháʼu'lláh gave him the title Zaynu'l-Muqarrabín ('The Ornament of the Near Ones'), the name for which he is known to Baháʼís. He is sometimes referred to as Jináb-i-Zayn (The Excellent Zayn), or Harfu'z-Zá (the Letter Z).

== Background ==
He was born in the month of Rajab 1233 AH (May 1818 AD) in one of the villages of Najafábád, Iran, near Isfahan, to a family of Muslim clerics. He himself became a preacher at a mosque in Najafábád.

== Life as a Bábí ==
In 1851, Zaynu'l-Muqarrabín became a follower of the Báb, and began teaching his newfound faith in his hometown, causing opposition from his previous admirers. Under his leadership the Bábí faith grew in the area. Around August 1852, Shaykh ʻAzíz Alláh Núrí sent two letters to Nasír al-Dín Sháh with names of several prominent Bábís whom he considered dangerous and deserving of punishment, including his nephews Baháʼu'lláh and Azal, and Zaynu'l-Muqarrabín. According to the letters, several of the men claimed to be manifestations of various figures of the past, and he listed Zaynu'l-Muqarrabín as claiming to be the return of Imam Zayn al-ʻÁbidín.

Sometime after 1852 Zaynu'l-Muqarrabín tried to visit Bábí leaders in Baghdad, but failed to find Subh-i-Azal and Baháʼu'lláh was away from Baghdad at the time. During that visit he met only with Kalím before going on to Kárbilá.

On his return journey, while approaching Najafábád, Zaynu'l-Muqarrabín learned of violent persecution against Bábís there, and decided to return to Iraq. He arrived in Baghdad again in 1856, after Baháʼu'lláh had returned from Sulaymáníyyih, and was confirmed in his faith after meeting him. After returning to Najafábád, he accepted Baháʼu'lláh's claim of prophethood when it was announced in 1863. A transcribed 23-page letter he wrote to a fellow Bábí, inviting him to accept Baháʼu'lláh, was held in the collection of E. G. Browne.

== In Iraq ==
According to ʻAbdu'l-Bahá, during this time after becoming a Baháʼí, "In Persia his life was in imminent peril; and since remaining at Najaf-Ábád would have stirred up the agitators and brought on riots, he hastened away to Adrianople" to meet Baháʼu'lláh again, then returned to Iran.

In 1864 he left Iran for the last time and moved to Baghdad. In 1867, Zaynu'l-Muqarrabín and 52 other Baháʼís of Baghdad wrote an appeal to the Congress of the United States for assistance in freeing Baháʼu'lláh from confinement by Ottoman authorities. This appeal arrived at the American Consul in Beirut and was commented upon by American missionary Henry Harris Jessup.

Beginning in 1868, and instigated by conversions of Sunni Muslims to the Baháʼí Faith, the Baháʼís of Baghdad, including Zaynu'l-Muqarrabín, were arrested and imprisoned repeatedly. In April-May 1868, three or four Baháʼís of Baghdad were killed by Persian Shias, likely offended by Baháʼís celebrating holy days during their mourning ceremonies.

In preparation for a pilgrimage by Nasiru'd-Din Shah to shrines in Iraq, the Consul-General of Persia petitioned the governor of Baghdad to expel all Baháʼís from the city. In 1870, about seventy Baháʼís, men, women, and children, were sent under military escort from Baghdad to Mosul, in northern Iraq. Their arrival was met with stones thrown at them from rooftops and businesses refusing to trade with them. Pilgrims returning from ʻAkká brought goods from Baháʼu'lláh to relieve their suffering. In Mosul Zaynu'l-Muqarrabín acted as leader of the Baháʼí community and he was also the main conduit of the writings of Baháʼu'lláh passing from ʻAkká to Iran. Under his supervision the Baháʼís of Mosul began the first charity fund ever organized by Baháʼís.

E. G. Browne visited Iran in 1887-88 and records that a Baháʼí of Kirmán told him, "[Zaynu'l-Muqarrabín in Mosul] is one of the most notable of 'the Friends', and to him is entrusted the revision and correction of all copies of the sacred books sent out for circulation, of which, indeed the most trustworthy are those transcribed by his hand."

== In ʻAkká ==
In 1886 he left Mosul and moved to ʻAkká, living in the Khán-i-ʻAvámid, and served as a secretary of Baháʼu'lláh.

In April 1890, when Edward Granville Browne held four interviews with Baháʼu'lláh, he reviewed and copied from many Baháʼí manuscripts, all in the hand of Zaynu'l-Muqarrabín. Browne was given two of them to take with him: the Kitáb-i-Íqán and A Traveller's Narrative. The latter was later translated to English and published by Browne in 1891.

After each transcription, Zaynu'l-Muqarrabín left a colophon that usually indicated his name, location, number, and date of the copy. For example, the colophon on the transcription of the Kitáb-i-Íqán that Browne received indicated that it was the 67th copy by Zaynu'l-Muqarrabín:

There ceased from the transcription of this its poor writer the Letter Zá on the night of Jemál [Sunday] the night of Masá'il [the 15th day] of the month of Sharaf [the 16th month] of the 45th year [that is the year] Abad [the seventh] of the third Váhid, corresponding to the eleventh of the month of Jemádí I of the months of the year 1306 after the Flight of the Prophet (upon its fugitive be a thousand salutations and greetings). Praise be to God who hath helped me to complete it, such praise as is worthy of the Court of His sanctity. Number 67.

After Baháʼu'lláh's death in 1892, Zaynu'l-Muqarrabín stayed in the ʻAkká/Haifa area and served ʻAbdu'l-Bahá until he died in 1903. ʻAbdu'l-Bahá described his final years:

After the ascension [of Baháʼu'lláh] he was consumed with such grieving, such constant tears and anguish, that as the days passed by, he wasted away. He remained faithful to the Covenant, and was a close companion to this servant of the Light of the World, but he longed to rise out of this life, and awaited his departure from day to day. At last, serene and happy, rejoicing in the tidings of the Kingdom, he soared away to that mysterious land.

He was buried in a portion of the Muslim cemetery of ʻAkká on the grounds that later became the Israel School for Naval Officers. The portion of the cemetery used for Baháʼís after 1880 was later walled off to prevent vandalism.

== Legacy ==
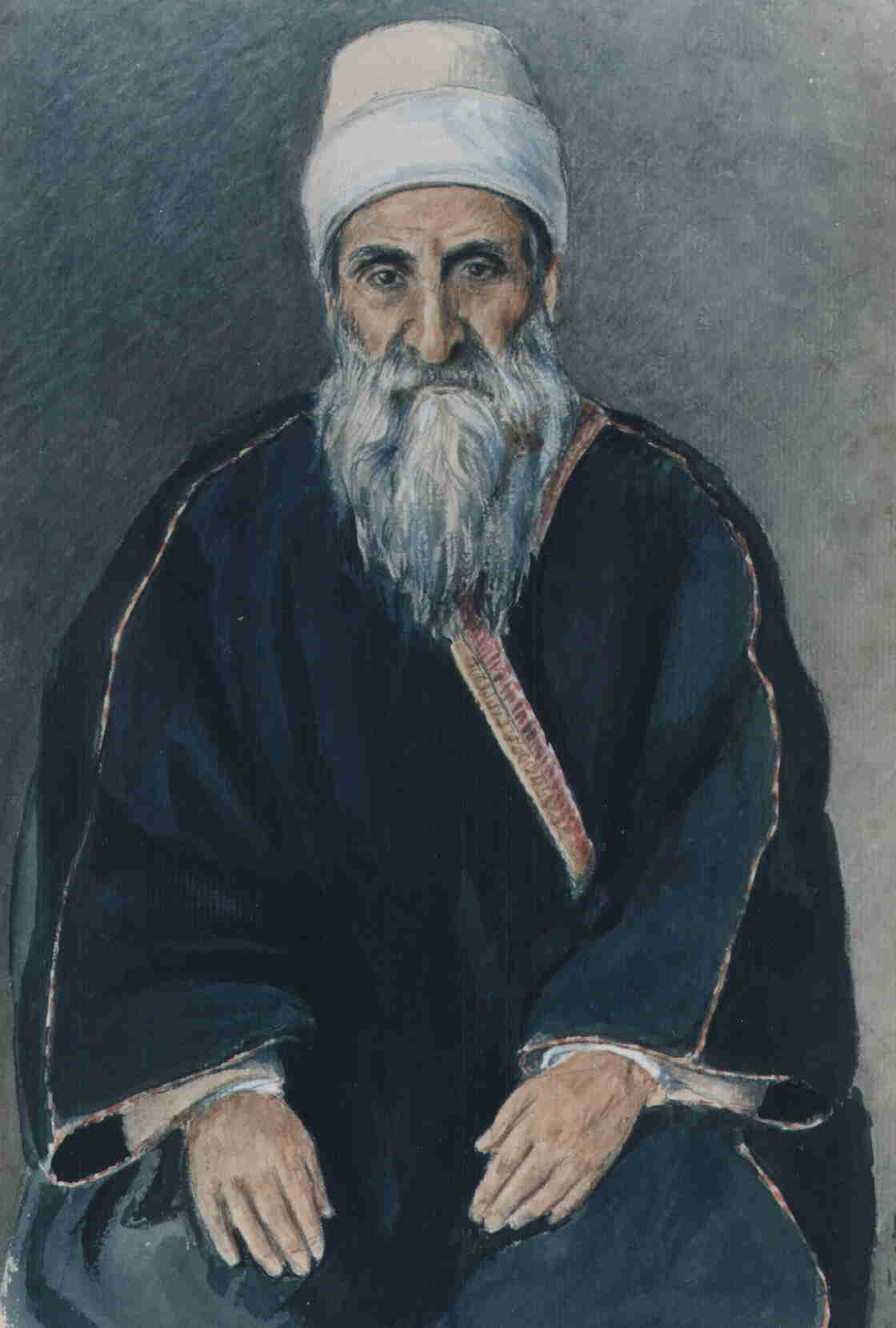
This painting of Zaynu'l-Muqarrabín by Ethel Rosenberg is on display in the Mansion of Bahjí

Zaynu'l-Muqarrabín was known for transcribing the Writings of Baháʼu'lláh and ensuring their distribution. Baháʼí author Adib Taherzadeh wrote the following about him,

Any Tablet in the handwriting of Zaynu'l-Muqarrabín is considered accurate. He has left to posterity, in his exquisite hand, many volumes comprising most of Baháʼu'lláh's important tablets; today Baháʼí publications in Persian and Arabic are authenticated by comparison with these.

E. G. Browne used his colophons to calculate the Badíʻ calendar, remarking,

all the best and most correct manuscripts of the sacred books were written or revised by him ... in all that relates to the Bábí method of reckoning time Zeynu'l-Mukarrabín's authority is incontrovertible.

A copy of the Kitáb-i-Aqdas from January 1887, in the handwriting of Zaynu'l-Muqarrabín, is housed at the British Library. The library's description mentions, "His copies are highly regarded for their accuracy."

Sara Blomfield, a prominent early British Baháʼí, described Zaynu'l-Muqarrabín as, "one of the most devoted Baháʼís". His son, Mírzá Munír, translated some writings of the Bab into English for her.

Zaynu'l-Muqarrabín, along with Mishkín-Qalam, were known for their sense of humor and making jokes with Baháʼu'lláh.

There are two known tablets written by Baháʼu'lláh, addressed to Zaynu'l-Muqarrabín. They are known as Lawh-i-Zaynu'l-Muqarrabin I (in Majmu'ih-i-Alwah-i-Mubarakih, 1920, pp. 337–338) and Lawh-i-Zaynu'l-Muqarrabin II (upublished). He may have written a manuscript of his memoirs. His son, Núruʼd-Dín Zayn, later published his own memoirs of his experience with Baháʼu'lláh and his father (Khátirát-i Hayát dar Khidmat-i Mahbúb).

== Notes ==
- ʻAbdu'l-Bahá (1971). "Zaynu'l-Muqarrabín". Memorials of the Faithful. Wilmette: Bahá'í Publishing Trust. pp. 150–154.
- Afroukhteh, Youness (2003) [First published as Khatirat-i-Nuh-Saliy-i-ʻAkká 1952: Tehran]. Memories of Nine Years in ʻAkká. Translated by Masrour, Riaz. Oxford: George Ronald. pp. 19, 88, 136, 150, 160, 444. ISBN 0-85398-477-8.
- Balyuzi, Hasan (1970). Edward Granville Browne and the Baha'i Faith. London: George Ronald.
- Barnes, Kiser (November 2003). Stories of Baháʼu'lláh and Some Notable Believers. New Delhi, India: Baháʼí Publishing Trust. pp. 41, 115, 156, 165, 262–5, 280. ISBN 81-7896-021-4.
- Blomfield, Lady (1940). The Chosen Highway. London, UK: Baháʼí Publishing Trust.
- British Library. "Kitab al-aqdas and other Tablets by Baha'u'llah". National library of the United Kingdom. Archived from the original on 2023-05-13.
- Browne, Edward G. (1892). A Year Amongst the Persians. London: Adam and Charles Black.
- Browne, Edward G. (1932). Nicholson, Reynold A. (ed.). A Descriptive Catalogue of the Oriental Mss. Belonging to the Late E. G. Browne. ISBN 9780521043434.
- Browne, Edward G. (1975) [First published Cambridge 1891]. "Note Z: Zeynu'l-Mukarrabín". A Traveller's Narrative. London: Cambridge University Press. pp. 412–425. ISBN 90-6022-316-0.
- Cameron, Glenn (1996). Momen, Wendi (ed.). A Basic Baháʼí Chronology. Oxford, UK: George Ronald. ISBN 0-85398-404-2.
- MacEoin, Dennis (2008-11-30). The Messiah of Shiraz: Studies in Early and Middle Babism. Brill. ISBN 978-90-474-4307-0.
- Momen, Moojan (1981). The Babi and Baha'i Religions 1844-1944: Some Contemporary Western Accounts. Oxford: George Ronald. pp. 29, 265. ISBN 0-85398-102-7.
- Momen, Moojan (1985). "Mulla Zaynul-ʻÁbidín, surnamed Zaynu'l-Muqarrabín". In Balyuzi, Hasan (ed.). Eminent Baháʼís in the time of Baháʼu'lláh. The Camelot Press Ltd, Southampton. pp. 274–6. ISBN 0-85398-152-3.
- Momen, Moojan (2000) [Updated 16 September 2011]. "KALEMĀT-E MAKNUNA". Encyclopædia Iranica.
- Momen, Moojan (2007). Baháʼu'lláh: A Short Biography. Oxford, UK: Oneworld Publications. pp. 126–7, 140. ISBN 978-1-85168-469-4.
- Ruhe, David (2001) [First edition 1983]. Door of Hope: The Baháʼí Faith in the Holy Land (second revised ed.). Oxford: George Ronald. ISBN 0-85398-150-7.
- Smith, Peter (2000). "Zaynu'l-Muqarrabín". A Concise Encyclopedia of the Baháʼí Faith. Oxford, UK: Oneworld Publications. p. 369. ISBN 1-85168-184-1.
- Taherzadeh, Adib (1974). The Revelation of Baháʼu'lláh, Volume 1: Baghdad 1853-63. Oxford, UK: George Ronald. pp. 25–6. ISBN 0-85398-052-7.
- Taherzadeh, Adib (1977). The Revelation of Baháʼu'lláh, Volume 2: Adrianople 1863-68. Oxford, UK: George Ronald. pp. 69, 335–6. ISBN 0-85398-071-3.
- Taherzadeh, Adib (1983). The Revelation of Baháʼu'lláh, Volume 3: ʻAkka, The Early Years 1868-77. Oxford, UK: George Ronald. pp. 223, 278, 359. ISBN 0-85398-143-4.
- Warburg, Margit (2006). Citizens of the world: a history and sociology of the Bahaʹis from a globalisation perspective. Leiden: Brill. ISBN 978-90-474-0746-1. OCLC 234309958.
- Zayn, Núruʼd-Dín. Khátirát Hayát dar Khidmat-i Mahbúb. Afnan Library.
