= Arthur Baker (calligrapher) =

American calligrapher

Arthur Baker (c. 1930 – December 2016) was the creator of a distinctive and dramatic style of brush and pen calligraphy.

== Biography ==
Baker grew up in Berkeley, California. He attended school on the West Coast of the United States and New York City, where he studied under Oscar Ogg, George Salter, and Tommy Tompson.

Baker studied letterforms and historical calligraphic styles, about which he wrote many books. Baker also designed typefaces, and his own pens and brushes.

Baker lived most of his life in Andover, Massachusetts. His hobbies included designing, making and flying paper airplanes.

Baker died in December 2016, at the age of 86. His archive is held at Letterform Archive

== Typefaces ==
- Amigo
- Baker Sans—Eddie Bauer catalog logo and text.
- Baker Signet—designed in 1965.
- Calligraphica
- Cold Mountain
- Collier Script
- Daybreak
- Duckweed
- Fish Face
- Hiroshige
- Kigali
- Kigali Block
- Kigali Decorative
- Kigali ZigZag
- Marigold
- Mercator
- Oak Graphic
- Oxford
- Pelican
- Sassafras
- Signet—Coca-Cola used Signet Bold for the word 'Coke' and Fleet Bank uses it for its logo.
- Tiepolo—Lipton foods.
- Visigoth

== Bibliography ==
“Arthur Baker”, in David Consuegra, American Type Design and Designers (New York: Allworth Press, 2004), page 49-53

== Books by Arthur Baker ==
- Arthur Baker, Calligraphic Alphabets, (Dover, 1974)
- Arthur Baker, The Roman Alphabet, (Art Direction Book Co., 1976) ISBN 0-910158-23-1
- Arthur Baker, Dance of the pen, (Art Direction Book Co., 1978) ISBN 0-910158-45-2
- Arthur Baker, New Calligraphic Ornaments and Flourishes, (Mineola: Dover, 1981)
- Arthur Baker, Chancery Cursive: Stroke by Stroke, (Dover, 1982)
- Arthur Baker, Cut and Assemble Paper Airplanes That Fly, (Dover, 1982)
- Arthur Baker, Celtic Hand Stroke by Stroke (Irish Half-Uncial from "The Book of Kells"), (Dover, 1983)
- Arthur Baker, Calligraphic cut paper designs for artists and craftsmen, (Mineola: Dover, 1983)
- Arthur Baker, Calligraphic Swash Initials, (Dover, 1984)
- Arthur Baker, Arthur Baker's Historic Calligraphic Alphabets, (Dover)
- Arthur Baker, Encyclopedia of Calligraphy Styles
