= Acta Phytotaxonomica et Geobotanica =

- Discipline: Plant taxonomy, botany
- Language: English
- Edited by: Minoru N. Tamura

Publication details
- History: 1932–present
- Publisher: Japanese Society for Plant Systematics
- Open access: Yes

Standard abbreviations
- ISO 4: Acta Phytotaxon. Geobot.

Indexing
- ISSN: 1346-7565 (print); 1346-7565 (web)

Links
- Journal homepage; J-STAGE (1932–2001) (1–52); J-STAGE (2001–) (52–)

Acta Phytotaxonomica et Geobotanica (植物分類・地理, Shokubutsu bunrui・chiri) (APG) is a scientific journal of plant taxonomy and botany published by the Japanese Society for Plant Systematics (日本植物分類学会) (formerly by the Societas Phytogeographica of Kyoto). The journal was established along with the Societas Phytogeographica in 1932 by Gen-ichi Koidzumi. According to the International Plant Names Index, over 3,300 plant names have been first published in the journal.

== See also ==
- Journal of Japanese Botany
- Journal of Plant Research (formerly The Botanical Magazine (Tokyo))
