= Robert Haas (calligrapher) =

Haas photographed by Trude Fleischmann, circa 1930s

Robert Samuel Haas (April 16, 1898–December 5, 1997) was a Viennese-born calligrapher, typographer, photographer, art collector and book designer. He immigrated to the United States in 1939.

== Biography and career ==
Robert Samuel Haas was born on April 16, 1898, in Vienna, Austria-Hungary, to Daniel and Ernestine Haas (née Pick). He was raised in Vienna, and received a degree in engineering from Höhere Technische Lehranstalt. He studied calligraphy under Rudolf von Larisch and photography from Trude Fleischmann. In 1925, he opened his own hand press printing shop, Officina Vindobonesis, in Vienna with Carry Hauser and Fritz Siegel, that mainly catered to the arts community. In addition to publishing his own works, they also published material for Austrian novelist Hugo von Hofmannsthal, writer Otto Stoessl and artist Alfred Kubin. He designed the monogram for the Vienna Philharmonic Orchestra, which is still being used. His photo mural design for the Austrian Pavilion at the 1937 Paris World Fair, won the Grand Prix and the Gold Medal.

Haas immigrated to the United States in 1939 and started Ram Press in New York City. He was a professor of calligraphy and typography at Cooper Union in Lower Manhattan until his retirement in 1967. From 1970 to 1971 he taught calligraphy at Yale University, and also taught at Purchase College. His archives and collections of calligraphy and typography were donated to the Library of Congress in 1996.

In 1972, he was awarded the title of Beruss-Professor by Franz Jonas, then President of Austria for his outstanding work in the United States. He was also selected three times for 50 Books of the Year Award.

In 1946, he married Maude Dabbs, and they had two daughters. Haas died on December 5, 1997, in Valhalla, New York.

== See also ==
- Marcel Breuer
- Josef Hoffmann
- Adolf Loos
- List of calligraphers
