= Yukio Tanaka =

Yukio Tanaka may refer to:

- Yukio Tanaka (baseball) (born 1967), Japanese baseball player
- Yukio Tanaka (biwa) (born 1948), Japanese biwa player
