= Umewaka Minoru I =

Umewaka Minoru I 梅若実(初世)
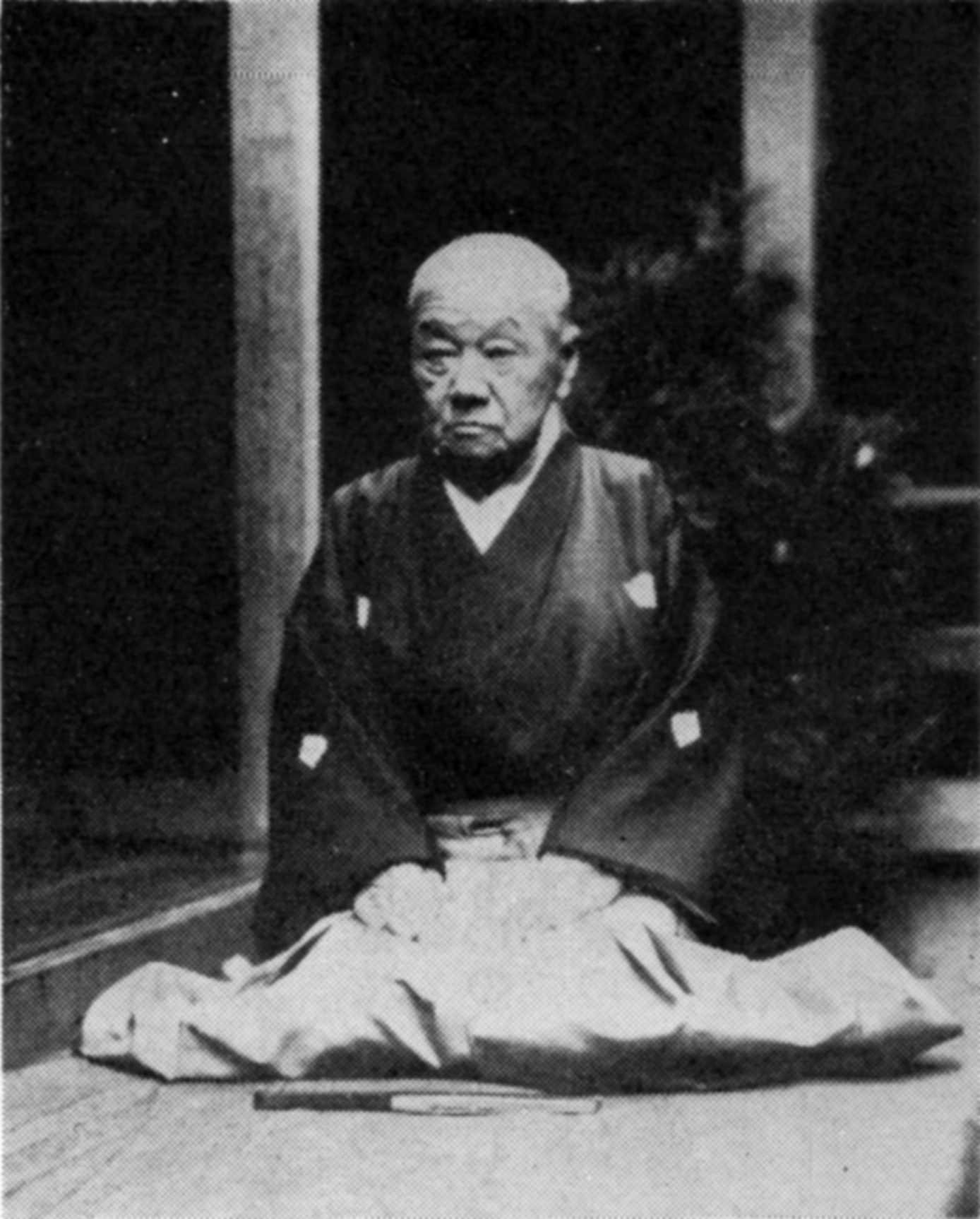
- Born: Umewaka Rokurō; May 26, 1828; Edo, Japan
- Died: January 19, 1909 (aged 80); Tokyo, Japan
- Parent(s): Kujirai Heizaemon (father); Umewaka Rokurō LI (adoptive father)
- Relatives: Umewaka Manzaburō I (eldest son); Umewaka Rokurō LIV (youngest son); Umewaka Rokurō LV (grandson); Umewaka Rokurō LVI (great-grandson); Fujima Kanjurō VIII (great-great-grandson)

Umewaka Minoru I (初世 梅若 実, Shosei Umewaka Minoru; July 7, 1828 – January 19, 1909), also Umewaka Rokurō LII (五十二世梅若六郎), was a leading actor in the Kanze school of Noh in late Edo and early Meiji period Japan. A prolific teacher of Noh in the Meiji period, he taught a variety of people including the painter Kōgyo, the writer Ezra Pound, and the scholar and art collector Ernest Fenollosa. His diary, published under the title Umewaka Minoru Nikki, spans much of his life, and records in great detail his activities and the world of Noh in the Meiji period.

== Biography ==
He was born in Kanda Gincho, Edo, as the second son of Kujirai Heizaemon, a purveyor to the Rinnoji Temple in Ueno. His childhood name was Kamejiro. In 1836, he was adopted by Umewaka Rokuro Ujiaki. After his adoption, he changed his name to Rokunojo and succeeded him as head of the family in 1839 He married in 1853 and changed his name to Rokuro Ujizane.

During the turbulent period of the Meiji Restoration, when the head of the Kanze school moved to Shizuoka with shōgun Tokugawa Yoshinobu, Noh theatre declined. However, Umewaka built Noh theatres, performed on the stage of his own home, and opened previously private Noh performances to the public for a fee. He is credited with reviving Noh theatre during the Meiji period and is known as one of the "Three Masters of the Meiji Period", along with Hōshō Kurō and Sakurama Banma.

== Sources ==
- Umewaka Minoru (2003). Umewaka Minoru Nikki. Tokyo: Yagi Shoten.
- Toyotaka Komiya (1956). Japanese music and drama in the Meiji era. Tokyo: Ōbunsha.
- Ernest Fenollosa and Ezra Pound (1916). "Noh", or, Accomplishment: a study of the classical stage of Japan. London: Macmillan.
- Torigoe Bunzo et al., "Umewaka Minoru Diary," seven volumes, Yagi Shoten. ISBN 4-8406-9641-1 (in Japanese).
- Kobayashi, Seiji (1981). "The Umewaka Family in Its Prosperity: Its History Since the Meiji Era". 華の能 : 梅若五〇〇年 (Hana no nō: Umewaka go rei rei-nen) [Flowering Noh: 500 Years of Umewaka] (in Japanese). Kodansha.
