= Naoki Tanaka =

Naoki Tanaka may refer to:

- Naoki Tanaka (comedian), television presenter and member of the comedy duo "Cocorico"
- Naoki Tanaka (footballer) (born 1993), a footballer for Azul Claro Numazu
- Naoki Tanaka (politician) (born 1940), a member of the Japanese House of Councillors from Niigata Prefectural electorate
- Naoki Tanaka (kickboxer) (born 1992), Japanese kickboxer
