= Mishkín-Qalam =

Prominent Baháʼí and calligrapher of 19th-century Persia

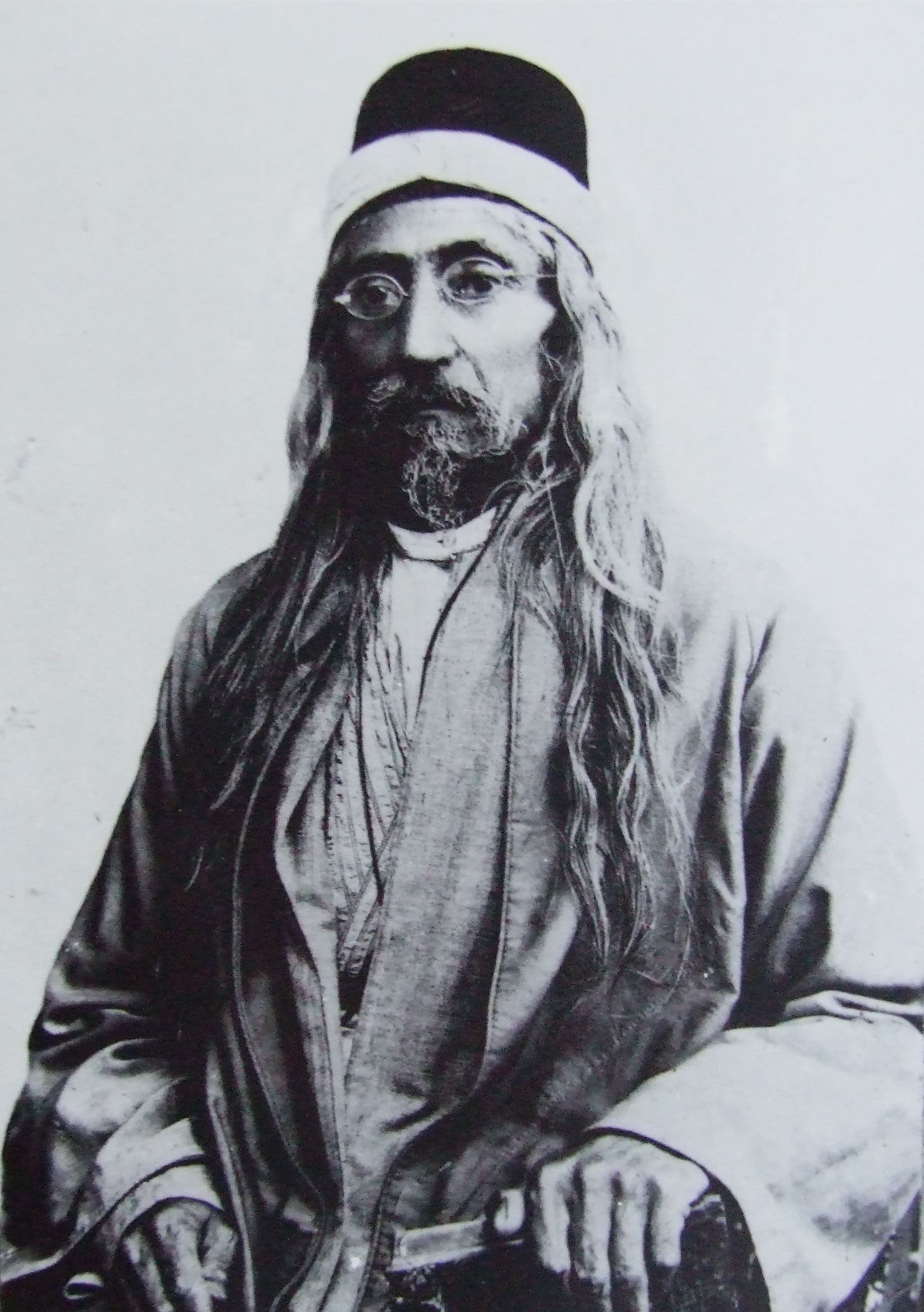

Mírzá Ḥusayn-i-Isfahání (surnamed Mis͟hkín-Qalam (مشكین قلم) meaning "jet-black pen"; 1824 – 1912) was a prominent Baháʼí and one of the nineteen Apostles of Baháʼu'lláh, as well as a famous calligrapher of 19th-century Persia. He is the author of a calligraphic rendering of the Greatest Name, used by Baháʼís around the world.

== Background ==
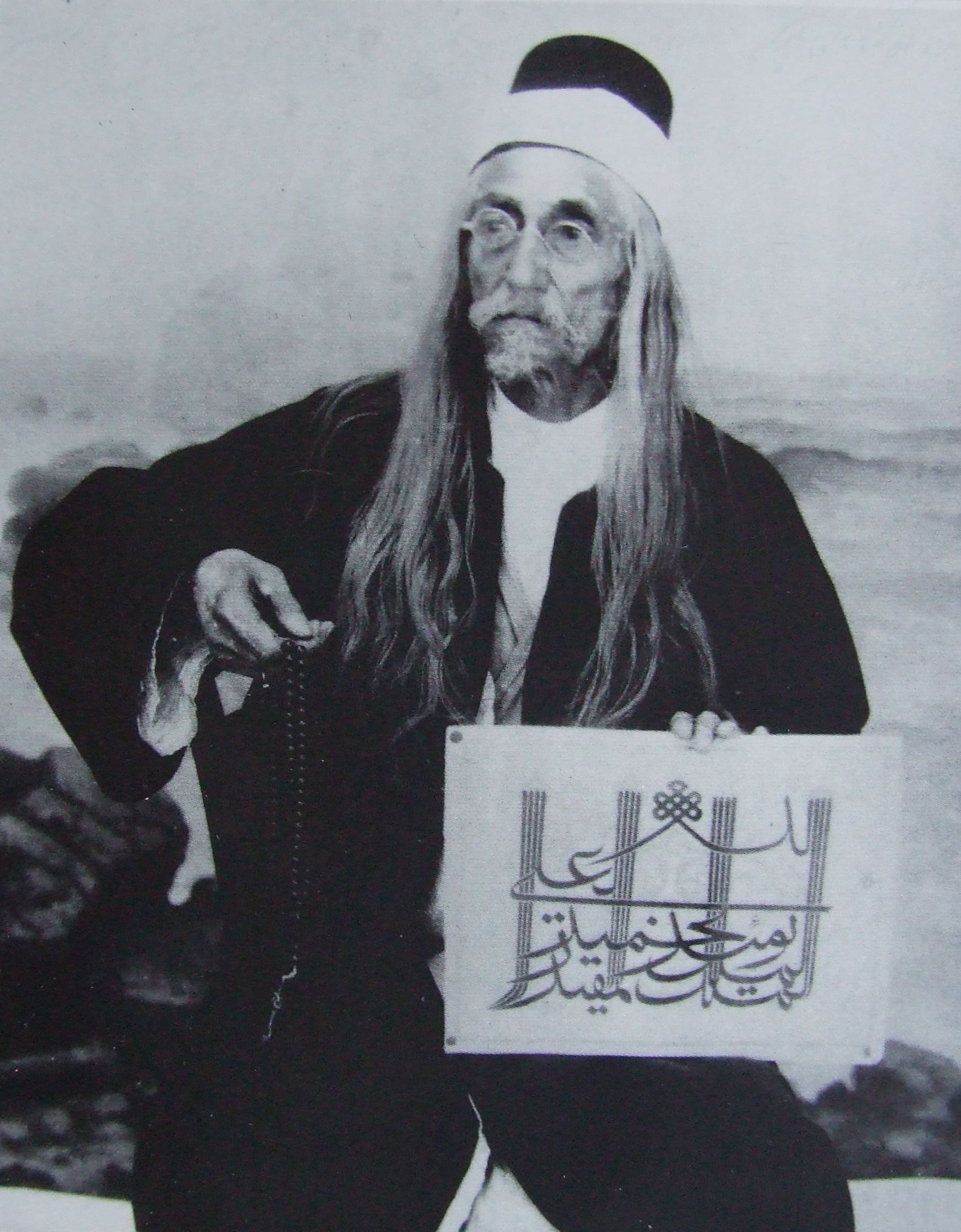

Mishkín-Qalam was born in Shíráz but was a resident of Isfahán, which is where he first heard of the Baháʼí Faith. A few years later he travelled to Baghdad and learned in more detail from Zaynu'l-Muqarrabín and Nabíl-i-Aʻzam, but was not confirmed until he later travelled to Adrianople and met Baháʼu'lláh.

Before becoming a Baháʼí, he was a Súfí of the Ni'matu'lláhí order.

== Imprisonment ==
Mishkín-Qalam was sent by Baháʼu'lláh to Constantinople (Istanbul), where he began attracting people through his art and vigorously teaching the Baháʼí Faith. The Persian ambassador began to complain to the Sultan's vazirs and soon had him arrested. When Baháʼu'lláh was exiled to ʻAkká, Mishkín-Qalam was exiled to Cyprus with the followers of Subh-i-Azal, where he remained a prisoner in Famagusta from 1868 to 1877.

Cyprus eventually left Ottoman control and Mishkín-Qalam was released. He made his way to ʻAkká (Acre) in 1886, and remained there until Baháʼu'lláh died in 1892, after which he travelled to Egypt, Damascus and India. He remained in India until 1905, and then returned to Haifa until his death in 1912.

== Calligraphy ==
Mishkín-Qalam was a renowned calligrapher. ʻAbdu'l-Bahá called him a second Mír ʻImád, a 16th-century calligrapher of the Safavid dynasty who is perhaps the most celebrated Persian calligrapher.

Mishkín-Qalam enjoyed a special position among the court ministers of Tihrán, and he became widely known for being adept at every calligraphic style. When E.G. Browne was in Persia, he was told that Mishkín-Qalam's works

"would be eagerly sought after by Persians of all classes, were it not that they all bore, as the signature of the penman, the following verse:

Lord of calligraphy, my banner goes before;
But to Baha'u'llah, a bondsman at the door,
Naught else I am, Mishkín-Qalam.

When visiting Baháʼu'lláh in Adrianople (Edirne), he would often write out the phrase Yá Baháʼu'l-Abhá (O Glory of the All-Glorious) in many different forms, some taking the form of a bird, and send them everywhere. One of his renderings of this phrase is now one of the three common symbols of the Baháʼí Faith, known as the Greatest Name.

== Gallery ==
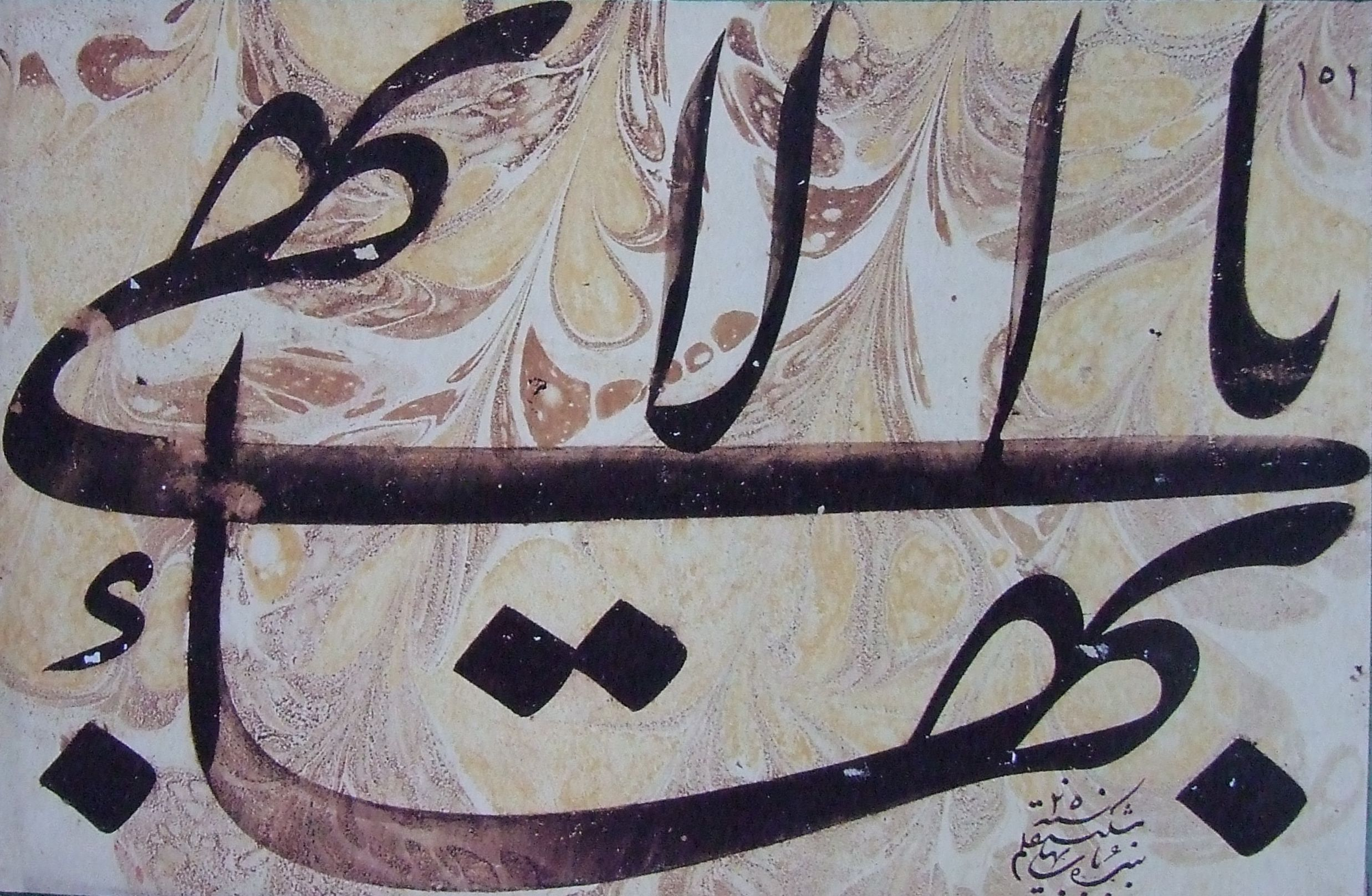

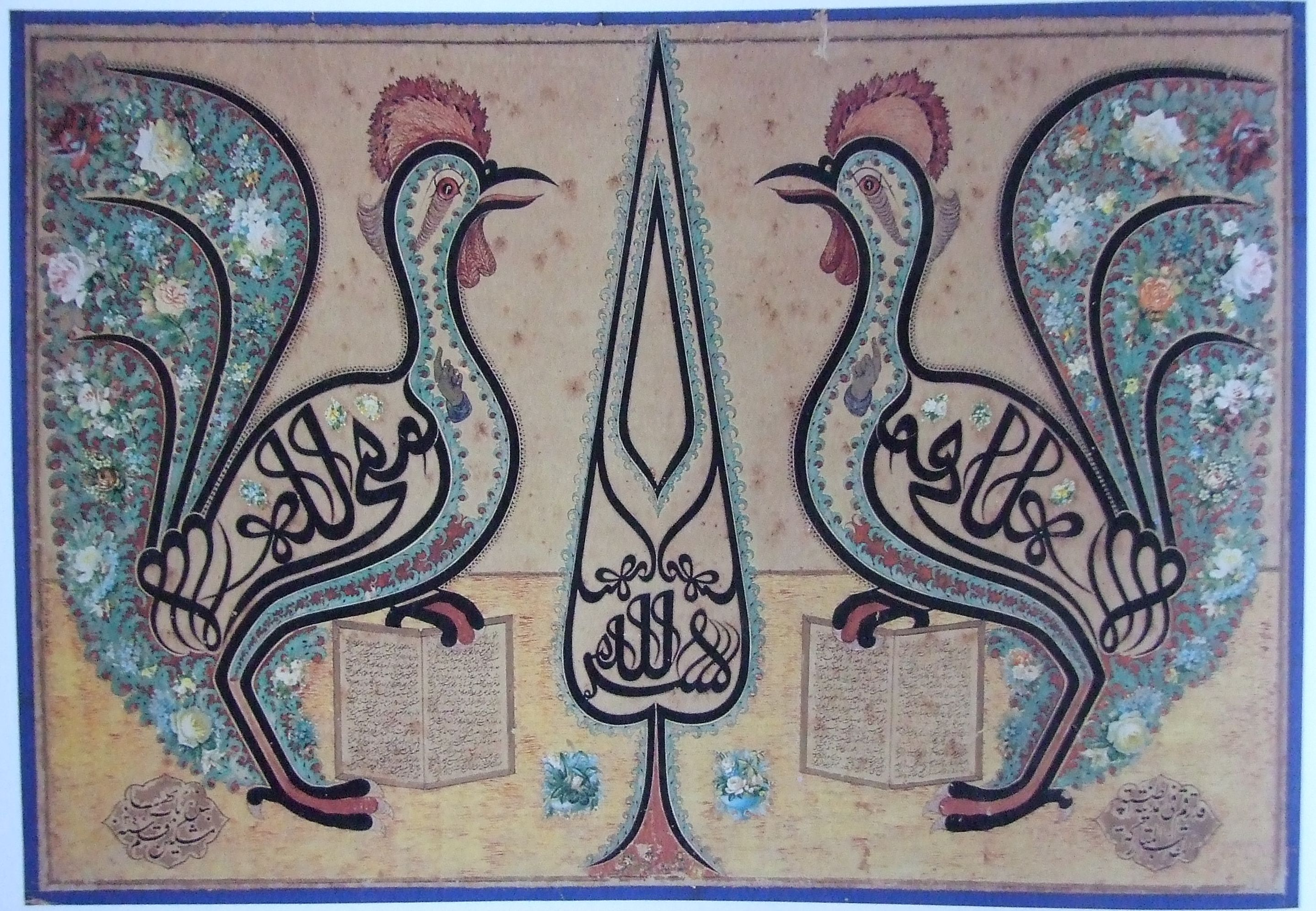

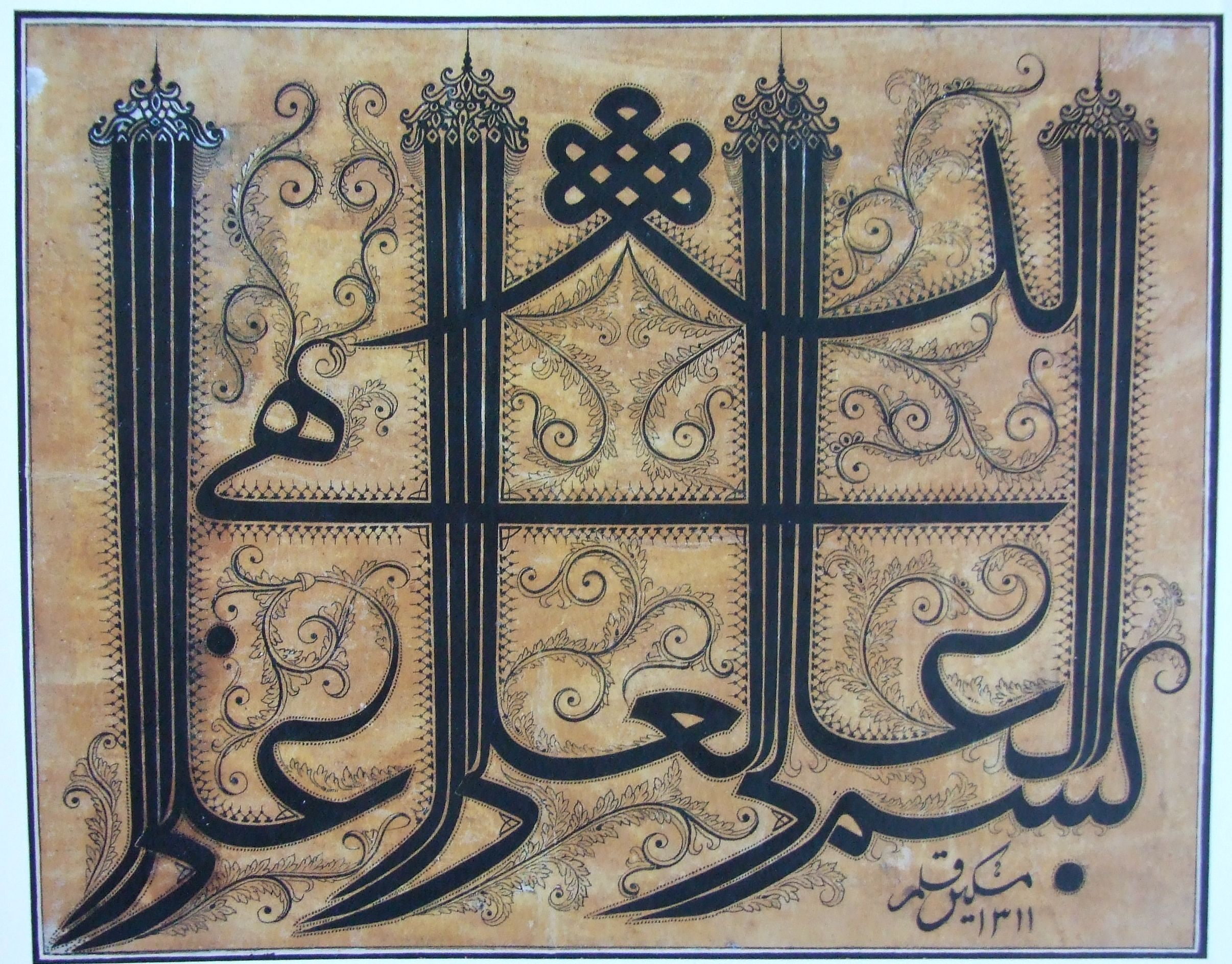

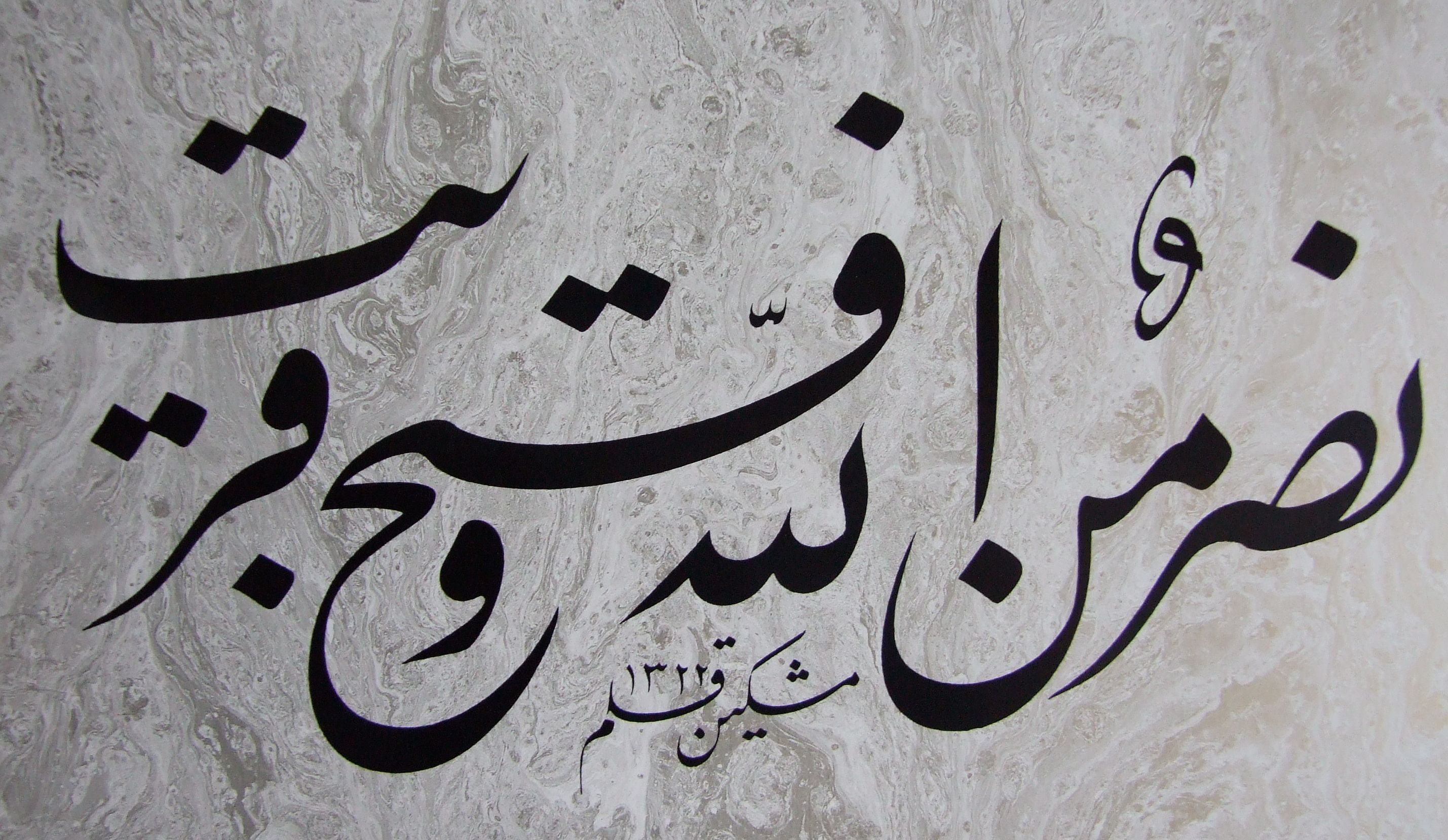

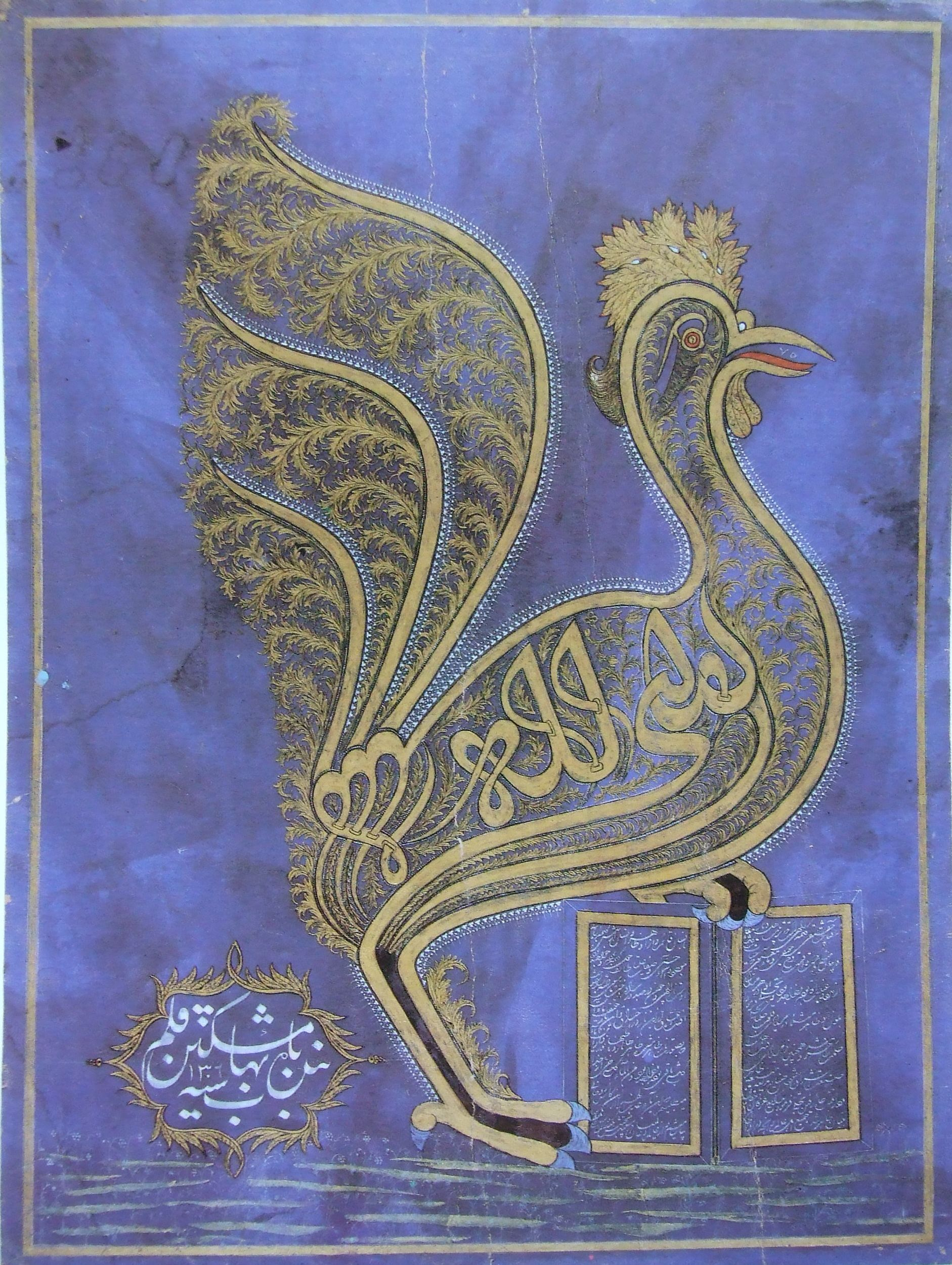

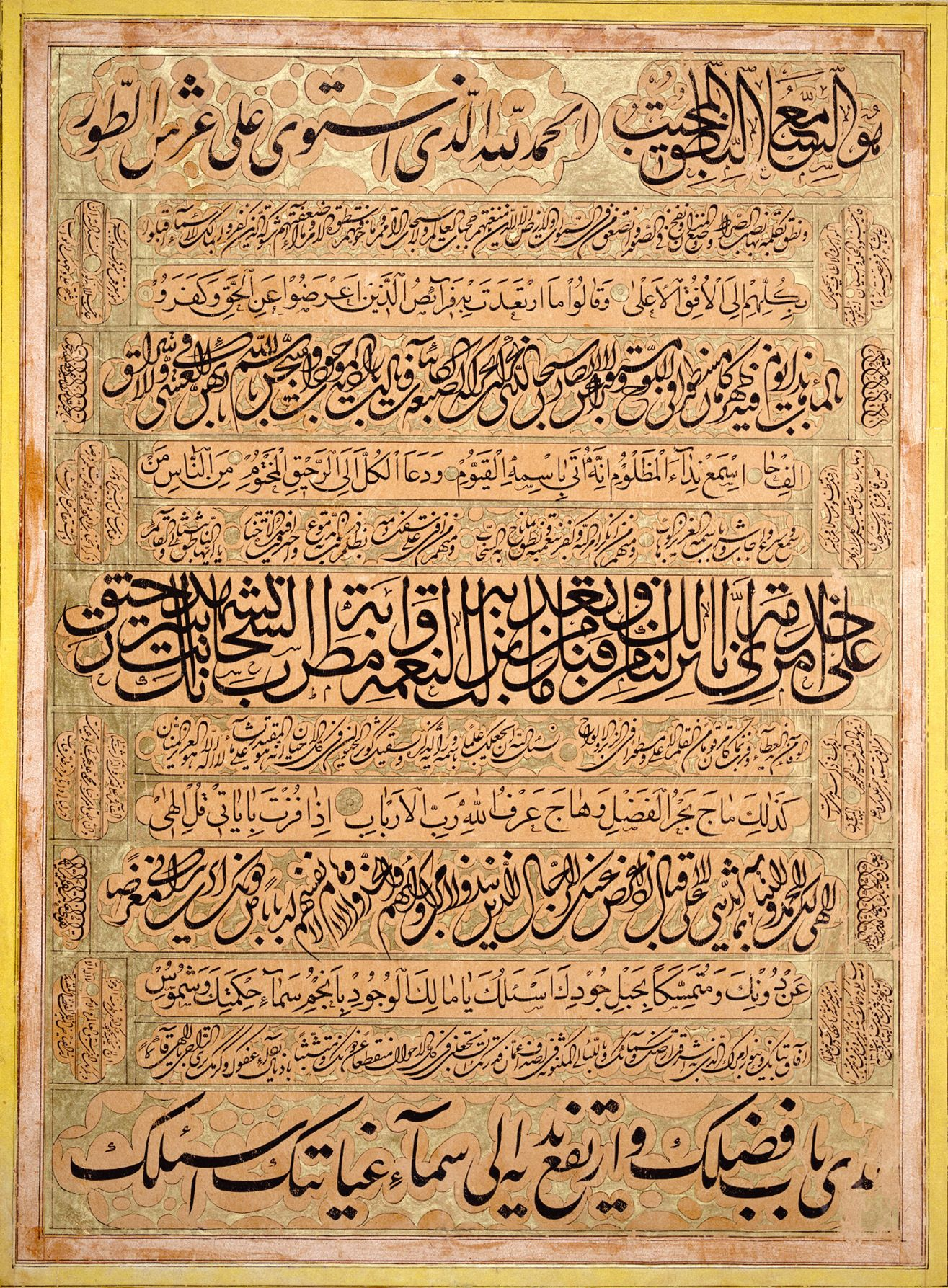

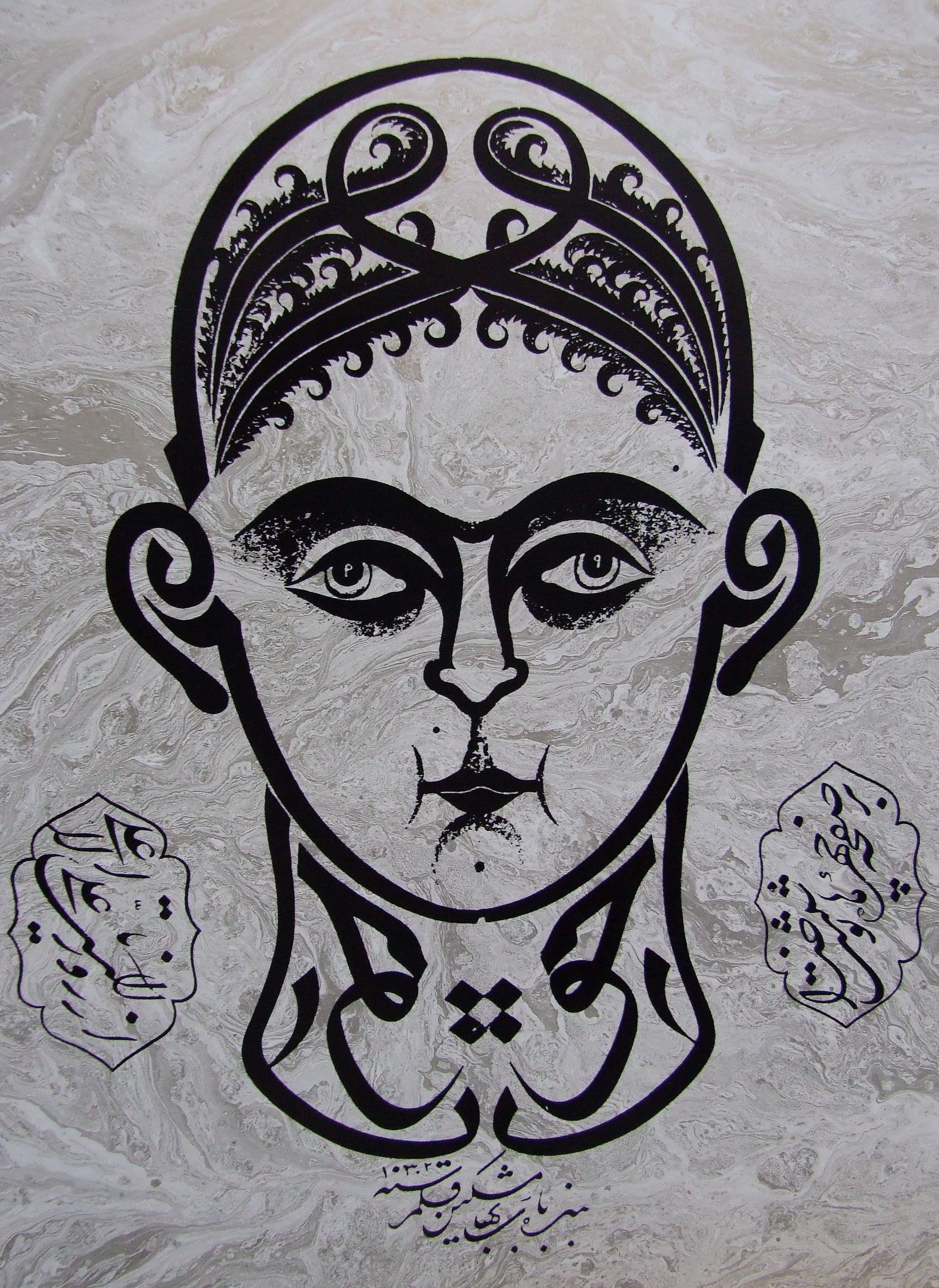

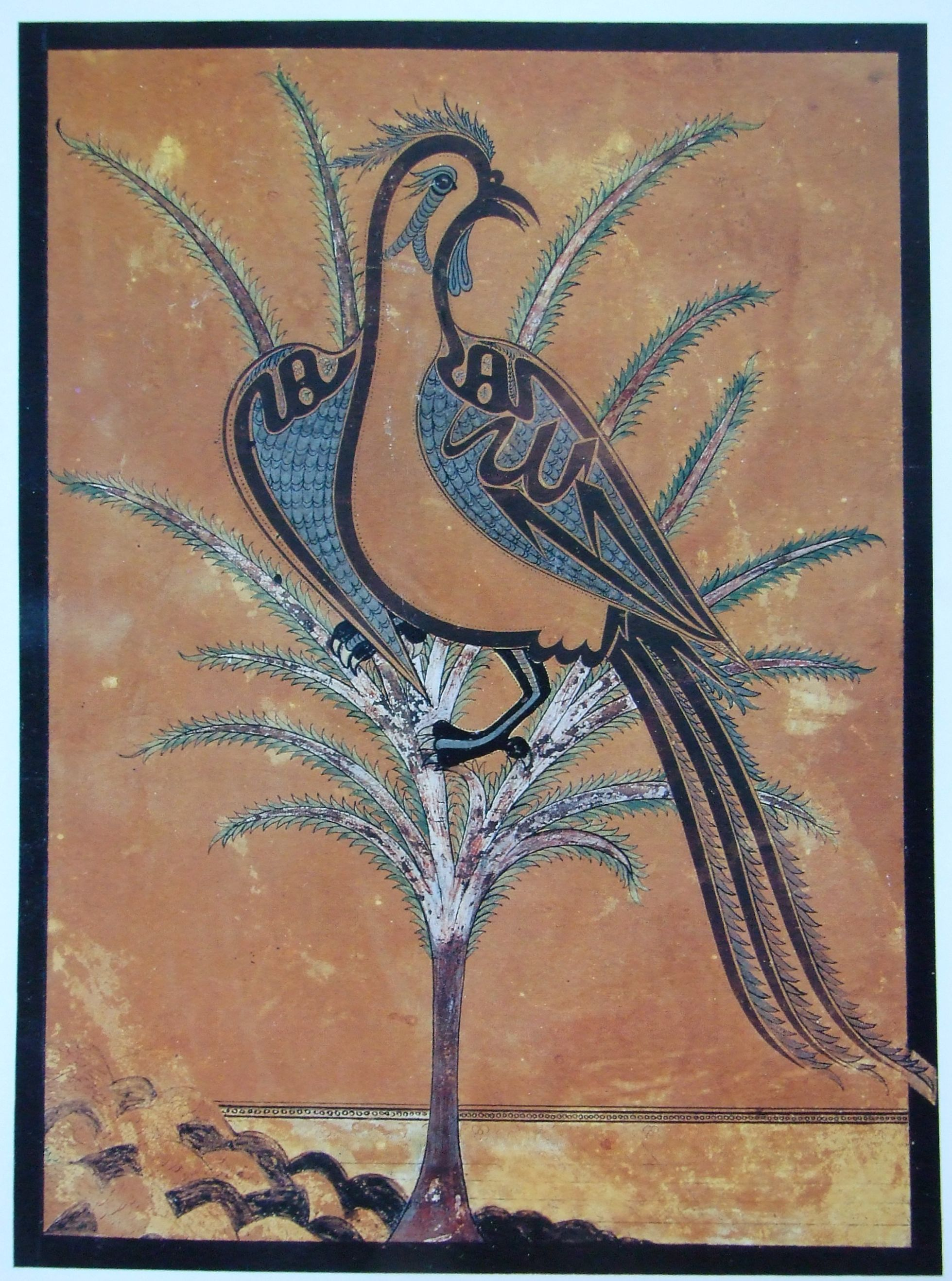

== See also ==
- Persian calligraphy
