= Kohei Tanaka =

Kohei Tanaka may refer to:

- Kohei Tanaka (composer), Japanese composer
- Kohei Tanaka (footballer), Japanese footballer
