= Tetsuya Tanaka =

Tetsuya Tanaka may refer to:

- Tetsuya Tanaka (racing driver) (born 1965), Japanese racing driver
- Tetsuya Tanaka (footballer) (born 1971), Japanese football player
