= Kim Eung-heon =

South Korean calligrapher (1927–2007)

Kim Eung-heon (Korean: 응현; Hanja: 膺顯; 1927–2007), also spelled Kim Ung-hyon, was a prominent South Korean calligrapher. In 1956, Kim and others supporters of Korean traditional culture established the Tongbang Yonsohoe for the purpose of researching and promoting Eastern calligraphy. The calligrapher served as president of this organization, promoting the art form in a number of East Asian countries.

According to the Korea Times, "[m]any of Kim's works are highly acclaimed for the harmonizing of Chinese calligraphy style with other various types of cursive writing and his meticulous penmanship."

One of his students was the South Korean artist Ms. Kim Ah-Young.
