= Oscar Ogg =

American calligrapher and writer (1908–1971)

- Self-portrait of Oscar Ogg
- Born: December 13, 1908; Richmond, Virginia
- Died: August 10, 1971 (aged 62); Stamford, Connecticut
- Occupations: Calligrapher, typographer, illustrator, writer, graphic designer
- Years active: 1932-1971

Oscar Ogg (1908–1971) was an American calligrapher and writer.

== Life ==
He was born in Richmond, Virginia, in 1908 and graduated from the University of Illinois in 1931. He worked for the Book-of-the-Month club and also studied, lectured on, and practiced calligraphy in New York. In 1946, his book The 26 Letters was published by Crowell. This was a history of the alphabet from Phoenician times to the present. Ogg developed typefaces and fonts still in use in the 21st century. He died in 1971 in Stamford, Connecticut.
