= Journal of Plant Research =

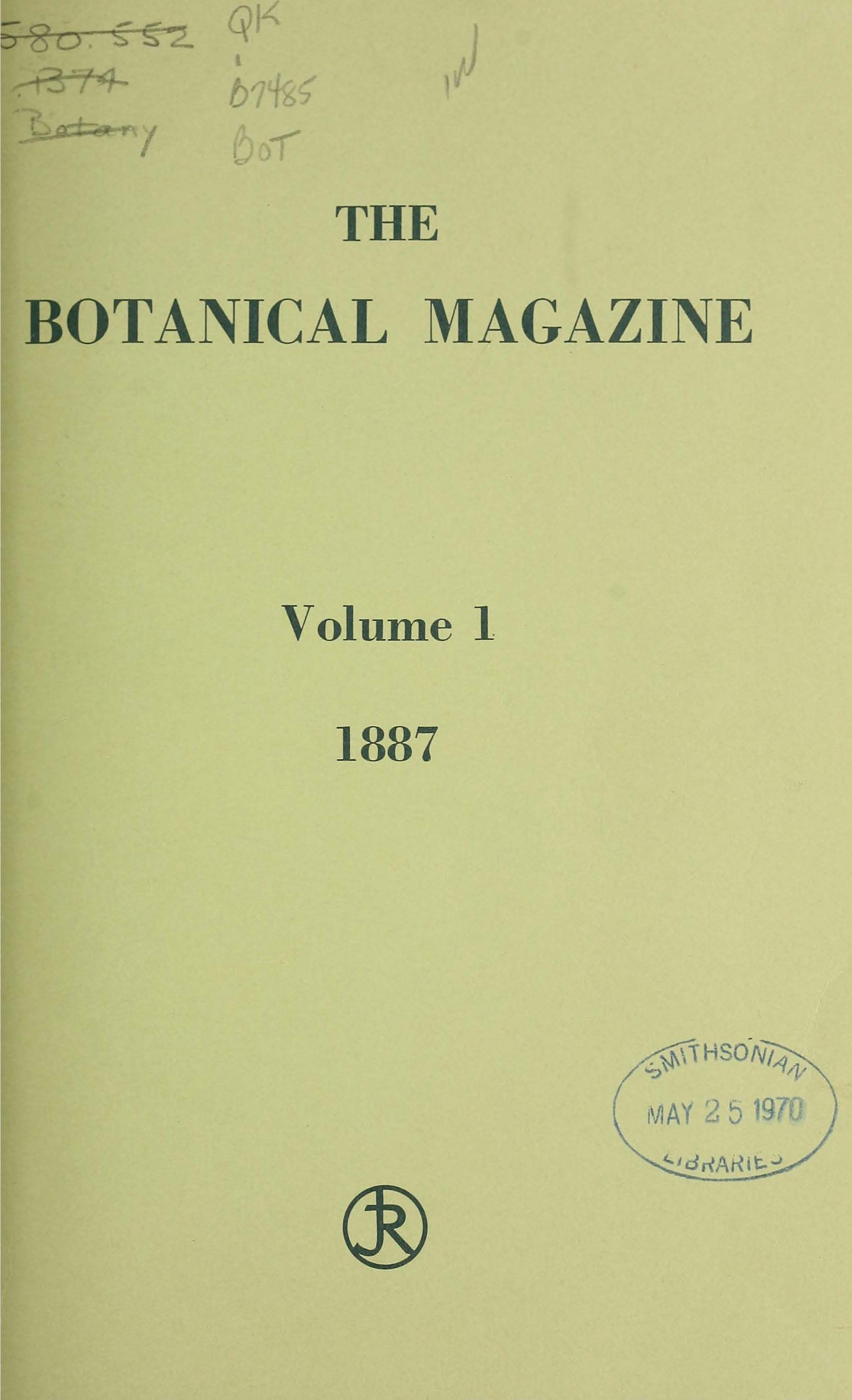
- The Botanical Magazine, vol. 1 (1887)
- Discipline: Botany
- Language: English
- Edited by: Maki Katsuhara

Publication details
- Former name: The Botanical Magazine
- History: 1887–present
- Publisher: Springer Science+Business Media
- Frequency: Bimonthly
- Open access: Hybrid
- Impact factor: 2.629 (2020)

Standard abbreviations
- ISO 4: J. Plant Res.

Indexing
- CODEN: JPLREA
- ISSN: 0918-9440 (print); 1618-0860 (web)
- LCCN: 93640915
- OCLC no.: 397383785

Links
- Journal homepage; Online archive

The Journal of Plant Research is a bimonthly peer-reviewed scientific journal of botany published on behalf of the Botanical Society of Japan by Springer Science+Business Media. Its predecessor, The Botanical Magazine (植物學雜誌, Shokubutsugaku zasshi) of Tokyo, first published in 1887, ran until volume 105 in 1992; during this period, over 4,900 plant names were first published in its pages. The journal obtained its current name in 1995.

== Abstracting and indexing ==
The journal is abstracted and indexed in:

- Aquatic Sciences and Fisheries Abstracts
- Biological Abstracts
- BIOSIS Previews
- CAB Abstracts
- Current Contents/Agriculture, Biology & Environmental Sciences
- EBSCO databases
- Embase
- Index Medicus/MEDLINE/PubMed
- ProQuest databases
- Science Citation Index Expanded
- Scopus

According to the Journal Citation Reports, the journal has a 2020 impact factor of 2.629.

== See also ==
- Journal of Japanese Botany
- Acta Phytotaxonomica et Geobotanica
