= Jenny Hunter Groat =

American artist (1929-2013)

Jenny Hunter Groat (born August 30, 1929 – February 2013) was an American dancer, choreographer, painter, calligrapher, book artist and educator.

== Early life and education ==
Groat was born LaVida June Hunt in Modesto, California and moved to San Francisco to join the Anna Halprin-Welland Lathrop School and Dance Company. In 1956, Groat studied calligraphy at Reed College.

== Career ==
In 1961, Groat set up her own dance company Dance West. Groat choreographed for KQED television, Stanford University, The Actors Workshop and the Carmel Bach Festival.

After retiring from dancing in 1968, she studied Zen and took part in Jungian analysis. In 1972, Groat moved to Mill Valley and established a calligraphy practice. She also produced art books and painted abstract art.

Her art book A Vision is in the collection of the National Museum of Women in the Arts. Her book Beauty and the Beast is in the collection of the Humanities Resource Center at the University of Texas at Austin.

She married Maurice "Pete" Frederick Groat.
