= Yasuhiro Tanaka =

Yasuhiro Tanaka may refer to:

- Yasuhiro Tanaka (baseball) (born 1987), Japanese baseball player
- Yasuhiro Tanaka (swimmer), Japanese Paralympic swimmer
- Kaidō Yasuhiro (born 1975, birth name Yasuhiro Tanaka), Japanese sumo wrestler
