= Jun Tanaka =

Jun Tanaka may refer to:

- Jun Tanaka (writer) (1890–1966), writer in Taishō and Shōwa period Japan
- Jun Tanaka (footballer) (born 1983), Japanese football player
- Jun Tanaka (chef), American-born British Japanese television chef
