= Aslam Kiratpuri =

Indian Digital calligrapher

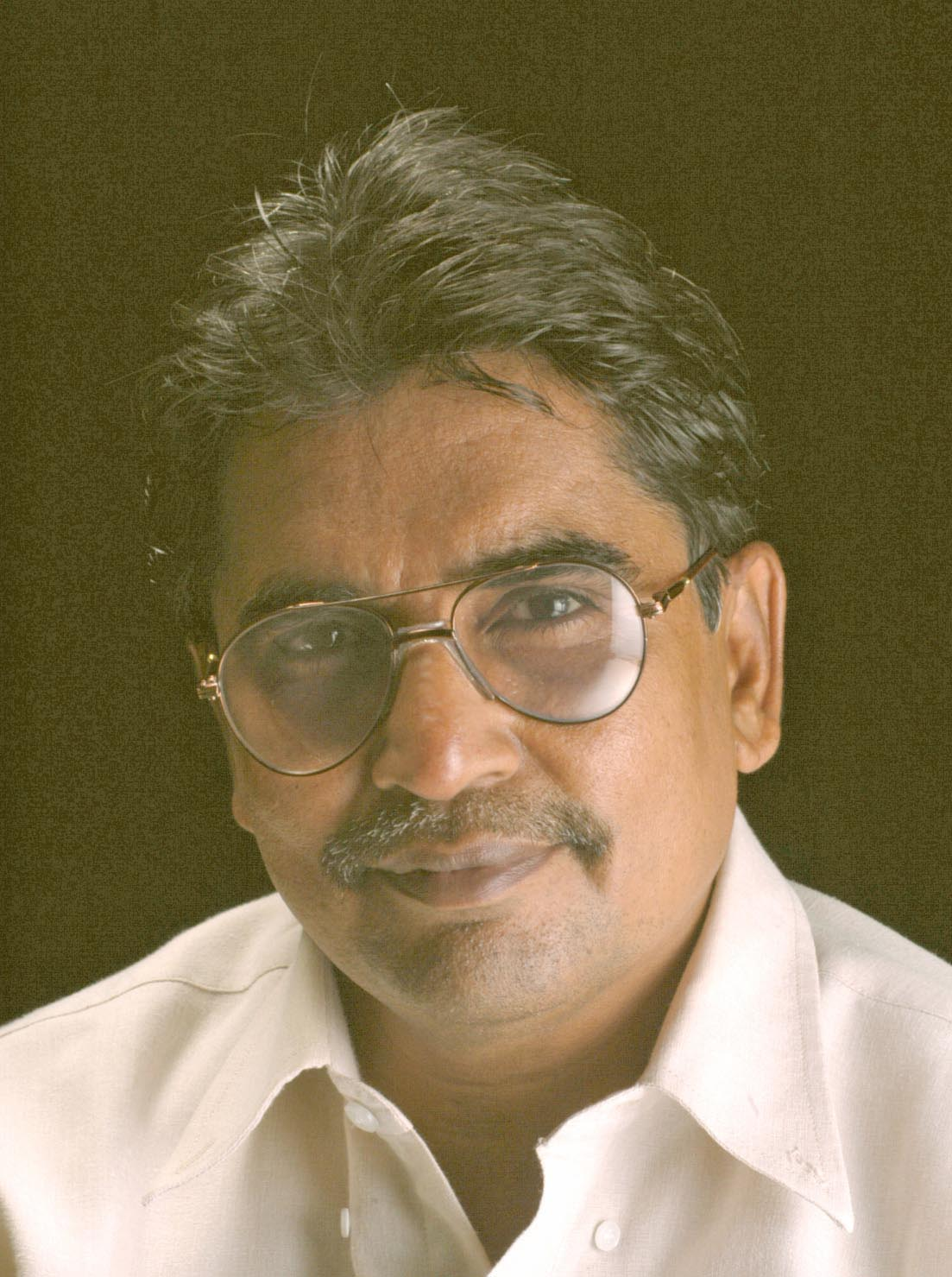
- Aslam Kiratpuri
- Born: 25 July 1951 (age 75); Kiratpur, Uttar Pradesh, India
- Known for: Lahori Nastalique calligrapher

Aslam Kiratpuri (born 1951) is an Urdu journalist, artist and a professional Lahori Nastalique calligrapher. Kiratpuri creates his calligraphic Toghras, intricate works of calligraphy in different styles using verses from the Quran along with various geometric and floral designs. He is the only Lahori Nastalique style calligrapher in India.

== Early life ==
He was born in 1951 at Kiratpur (Bijnour) a small town in Uttar Pradesh. He was interested in calligraphy since his childhood and learned the basics and finesse of the art from calligrapher and artist Faiz Mujjadid Lahori. He specialises in different styles of Quranic calligraphy.

== Career ==
He first took to calligraphy as a hobby and in 1975 made it a regular profession. In 1979, he was elected as a Founder President of the Urdu Calligraphers Association India, By the end of 1982, He published his first book on calligraphy " Muraqqa - e - Faiz". In 2005, he was elected as President of Fankar Art Academy of India. In 2006, Aslam Kiratpuri, Dr. Rehan and Syed Manzar Zaidi developed a flexible font called Faiz Nastaliq in tribute to his former teacher Faiz Mujaddid Lahori.
