= Tatsuya Tanaka =

Tatsuya Tanaka may refer to:

- Tatsuya Tanaka (figure skater) (born 1988), Taiwanese figure skater
- Tatsuya Tanaka (footballer, born 1982), Japanese footballer
- Tatsuya Tanaka (footballer, born 1992), Japanese footballer
