= Huang Shi An =

Chinese calligraphy artist

Huang Shi An (黄石庵) (1903 – 1990) was a Chinese calligraphy artist.

Huang Shi An was born by the names of ‘Zi Zhen (子贞)’ and ‘Shi An (石庵)’. Originated from Guang Dong, China, Huang Shi An was of a Hakka descent, moved to Malaysia sometime in the 1940s - 1950s. He was the chief editor for Ma Hua Ribao, a judge for the national calligraphy contest and one of the founding members and consultant to Persatuan Seni Tulis Malaysia. Huang’s art exhibitions took to the international stage in Singapore and China (Research Institute of Traditional Chinese Painting in Beijing), for example. Huang’s notable publications include “The Calligraphy of Huang Shi An” (1988) and “The Calligraphy Exhibitions of Huang Shi An” (2005). Huang devoted his life to promoting calligraphy. He started his calligraphy journey with Northern Wei Dynasty’s tablet inscriptions, followed by other forms of stone-calligraphy. He was inspired by Qing Dynasty’s He Shao Ji, who was a calligrapher, poet and scholar himself. Huang further enriched his calligraphy with Kang You Wei’s attributes.
