= Masahiko Tanaka (disambiguation) =

Masahiko Tanaka is the name of:

- Masahiko Tanaka (born 1954), Japanese voice actor
- Masahiko Tanaka (karateka), Japanese karate master and former world champion
- Masahiko Tanaka (baseball), Japanese baseball player
