= Kōtarō Tanaka =

Kōtarō Tanaka may refer to:

- Kōtarō Tanaka (judge) (1890–1974), Japanese jurist, judge of the International Court of Justice, and politician
- Kōtarō Tanaka (photographer) (1901–1995), Japanese photographer
- Kōtarō Tanaka (actor) (born 1964), Japanese business executive and former actor
- Koutaro Tanaka (born 1982), or Kōtarō Tanaka, actor
- Kōtarō Tanaka, musician on "Stay the Ride Alive"
