= Yasuo Tanaka =

Yasuo Tanaka may refer to:

- Yasuo Tanaka (politician) (田中 康夫, born 1956), Japanese novelist and politician
- Yasuo Tanaka (astronomer) (田中 靖郎, 1931–2018), Japanese astronomer
- Yasuo Tanaka (voice actor) (田中 康郎, 1932–2003), Japanese voice actor
- Yasuo Tanaka (swimmer) (田中 寧夫, born 1932), Japanese swimmer
