= Tomohiro Tanaka =

Tomohiro Tanaka may refer to:

- Tomohiro Tanaka (footballer) (born 1991), Japanese footballer
- Tomohiro Tanaka (mixed martial artist), Japanese mixed martial artist
