= Yūsuke Tanaka =

Yūsuke Tanaka may refer to:

- Yusuke Tanaka (footballer, born February 1986) (田中 佑昌), Japanese footballer
- Yusuke Tanaka (footballer, born April 1986) (田中 裕介), Japanese footballer
- Yusuke Tanaka (gymnast) (born 1989), Japanese gymnast
- Yusuke Tanaka (director) (田中 裕介; born 1987), Japanese director
