= Atsuko Tanaka (disambiguation) =

Atsuko Tanaka (1962–2024) was a Japanese voice actress.

Atsuko Tanaka may also refer to:

- Atsuko Tanaka (animator) (born 1954), Japanese animator
- Atsuko Tanaka (artist) (1932–2005), Japanese avant-garde artist
- Atsuko Tanaka (ski jumper) (born 1992), Canadian Olympic ski jumper
