= Toshiya Tanaka =

Toshiya Tanaka may refer to:

- Toshiya Tanaka (footballer, born 1984) (田中 俊也), Japanese forward
- Toshiya Tanaka (footballer, born 1989) (田中 俊哉), Japanese forward for Briobecca Urayasu
- Toshiya Tanaka (footballer, born 1997) (田中 稔也), Japanese midfielder
