= Minoru Tanaka =

Minoru Tanaka may refer to:

- Minoru Tanaka (actor) (田中 実, 1966–2011), Japanese actor
- Minoru Tanaka (racing driver) (田中 実, born 1963), Japanese racing driver
- Minoru Tanaka (wrestler) (田中 稔, born 1972), Japanese professional wrestler
- Minoru Tanaka (田中 実), birth name of Jun Tazaki (田崎 潤, 1913–1985), Japanese actor
- Minoru Tanaka (田中 実), birth name of Minoru Sawatari (佐渡 稔, born 1949), Japanese actor, see Kamen Rider Black RX
- Minoru Tanaka, a character from the Death Note one-shot sequel chapter The a-Kira Story
