= Journal of Japanese Botany =

The Journal of Japanese Botany
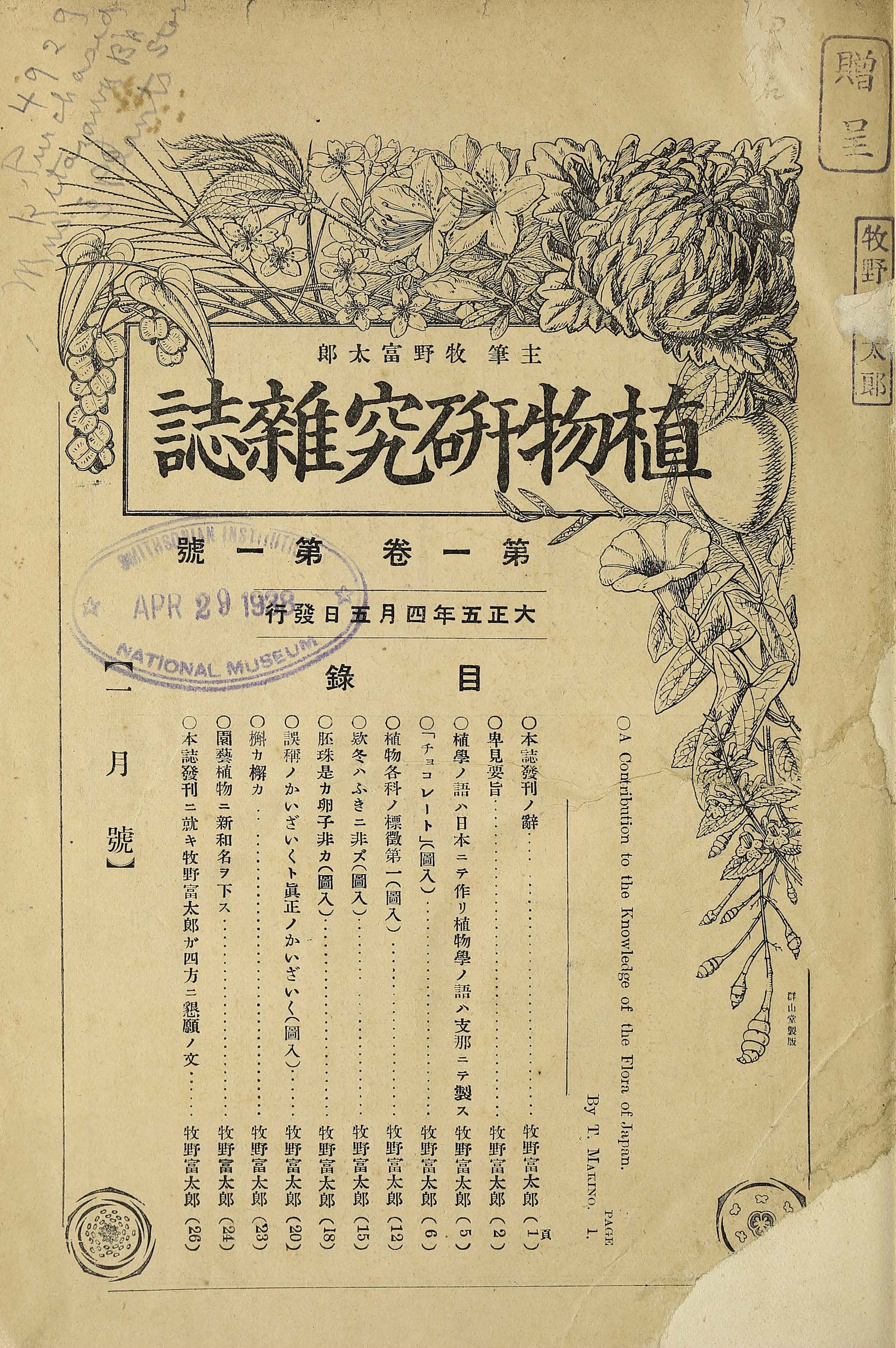
- 植物研究雑誌 vol. 1, no. 1 (5 April 1916)
- Discipline: Plant taxonomy & botany
- Language: Japanese, English
- Edited by: Ōhashi Hiroyoshi (2006–)

Publication details
- History: 1916–present
- Publisher: Tsumura & Co (Japan)
- Frequency: Bimonthly
- Open access: Hybrid

Standard abbreviations
- ISO 4: J. Jpn. Bot.

Indexing
- ISSN: 0022-2062 (print); 2436-6730 (web)
- OCLC no.: 5158666

Links
- Journal homepage

The Journal of Japanese Botany (植物研究雑誌, Shokubutsu kenkyū zasshi) is a scientific journal of plant taxonomy and botany. The journal was founded in April 1916 by Makino Tomitarō, who continued as editor until 1933. Makino was succeeded as chief editor by Asahina Yasuhiko (1933–1975), Hara Hiroshi (1975–1987), Shibata Shōji (1987–2006), and Ōhashi Hiroyoshi (2006–). According to the International Plant Names Index, over 5,500 plant names have been first published in the journal.
