= Minoru Kihara (television personality) =

Japanese actor, voice actor, and weather forecaster

- 木原 実
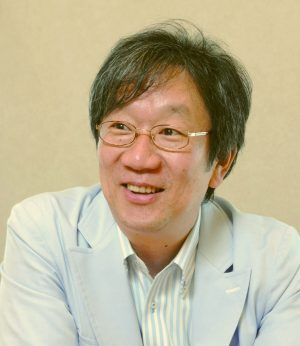
- Born: 17 July 1960 (age 65); Ikegami, Ōta, Tokyo, Japan
- Occupations: Voice actor; actor; weather forecaster (637th)–disaster prevention officer
- Years active: 1986–
- Height: 175 cm (5 ft 9 in)

Minoru Kihara (木原 実, Kihara Minoru; born 17 July 1960) is a Japanese actor, voice actor, and weather forecaster (637th)–disaster prevention officer, who is the Director of Disaster Education Promotion Association of General Foundation, and a representative of the yūgen gaisha, Minoru Kihara Jimusho. Born in Tokyo and raised in Kanagawa Prefecture, he currently lives in Nakano-ku, Tokyo.

== Biography ==
He was born in Ikegami, Ōta, Tokyo, but was moved to Fujisawa, Kanagawa when he was two years old.

He took rakugo during his early childhood, and started a theatre during his high school years. After graduating from Atsugi High School in Kanagawa Prefecture, in 1986, he graduated from the Department of Drama, of the Nihon University College of Art. He entered Akira Kamiya's office and start entertainment activities as a voice actor and reporter. Later in 1987, Kihara, Yukikazu Kano, Eisuke Sasai and others from the Hanagumi Shibai started and joined The Sumidagawa.

He passed the Weather Foreman Examination in 1995. In 1997, he participated in the Weather Summit in Paris, and started acting as a full-fledged weather forecaster. Later in 1998, he became independent, and established the Minoru Kihara Jimusho. In 2004, he obtained disaster prevention qualification. In 2005, he was inaugurated as a permanent secretary of the Japan Disaster Reduction Association.

In 2010, he was later inaugurated as the Cabinet Office "supporter of national campaign to alleviate disaster damage."

In 2016, he was ranked first in Oricon's "12th Favourite Weather Caster & Weather Forecasting Ranking."

At the end of October 2017, he bore serious cervical spine injuries, and was undergoing surgery, in which he reported on his blog on 24 November. He was later discharged on 22 March 2018, and on 26 March, he returned to news every. for the first time in about five months.

== Personal life ==
- He made many activities as a weather forecaster in news–information programmes, etc., he is also doing activities as an actor and narrator.
- He has many opportunities to appear mainly on Nippon TV programmes. For Nippon TV's evening news programmes, he has been running on four programmes and has been appearing on the network for many years. In NNN News Plus 1, since he was appearing from the start to the end (of weekdays) of its broadcast, he would be the only person to work on the programme.

== Appearances ==
=== News programmes ===
※Those without special mention matter, the majority of programmes are Nippon TV.

Current

- news every. weather corner–Particular Feature Narrator (weekdays, Mar 2010 –; however, Unless a serious weather incident occurs, he does not appear in NNN's nationwide frame.)
  From the end of October 2017, he was in recuperation due to cervical spine injury, and returned on 26 March 2018.

Former

- NNN Live on Network weather corner (weekdays, Oct 1987 – Mar 1988)
- NNN News Plus 1 weather corner (originally in Yanbō Mābō Tenkeyohō, Apr 1988 – Mar 2006)
- Zoom In!! Super weather corner (Tuesdays and Thursdays, 1 Oct 2001 – 31 Mar 2011)
- NNN News Realtime weather corner (weekdays, Apr 2006 – Mar 2010)
- Asaten 5–Zipang Asa 6 weather corner

=== Information–Variety programmes ===
- Hitachi Ashita P-Kan Kibun!
- Ponkickies (CX) – Voice of Professor Oyogu Taita
- The! Tetsuwan! Dash!!
- Sugao ga Īne'! – Narration
- Kaimono Daisuki! Megami no Ichiba – Narration
- Rakuraku! Otona Club (BS Nittele) – MC with Ikue Sakakibara
- Kai King: Emiere – Narration
- Tokoton Horisage-tai! Ikimono ni Thank You!! (TBS) – Narration

=== TV dramas ===
- The Negotiator (EX) – Episode 7; as Mochizuki
- Netchū Jidai – as Shine Ueno's father

=== TV anime ===
- Hokuto no Kobushi (CX) – as Raou's subordinate, etc.
- Minna Daisuki Sorajiro (short anime rebroadcast on news every. Tues-Thu and Oha!4 News Live Mon-Tue) – as Kumojiro; narration

=== Films ===
- ST Aka to Shiro no Sōsa File

=== Advertisements ===
- Lotte "Nodoame" (2016)

=== Others ===
- Oshiete! Otenki Caster Chikyū Ondan-ka de dōnaru Ijō Kishō (29 Dec 2015, NHK-G) – In this programme, with Nippon TV's Weather Character Sorajiro, he appeared with Hiroko Ida's position (at the time) in Kishō Jōhō of NHK's News Watch 9, and also appeared with TBS N Suta weather director Masamitsu Morita.
- Tamori Club "Kishōchō no Naka ni Senmon Shoten o Hakken! Kono Kishō Hon ga Sugoi!!" (10 Sep 2016, EX) – In this programme, he appeared as a guest with Akira Mori, who is in charge of weather for TBS' Hiruobi.
- Shinsō News (19 Jul 2017, BS Nittele–Nittele News24) – Guest

== Music participation ==
※Joined as the narrator in the songs

- Yuki Saito "Ending (Hello Dolly)" (1990, recorded in album Moon)
- Hiroko Taniyama "Sokkuri Ningyō Tenran-kai" (1991, recorded in album Ohirune Miya Osanpo Miya)
