= Shingai Tanaka =

Japanese calligrapher (1942–2007)

- Born: 1942; Tottori, Japan
- Died: 2007 (aged 64–65); Kyoto, Japan
- Known for: Japanese calligraphy

Shingai Tanaka (born 1942 in Tottori, Japan – 6 October 2007 in Kyoto) was a Japanese calligrapher who studied under Master Goshin Yasui, becoming one of the country's best shodō artists. He is the author of the book Sho, Le calligraphes de kyoto, ed. Cénton, 2008 (ISBN 2-915384-06-1).

In the 1980s Tanaka founded the Kyoto Calligraphers Association (Kyoto shodō Renmei) to promote Japanese calligraphy (書道, shodō). He was president of Sho International, president of the Kyoto Artists Calligraphy Association, and special professor at Kyoto Saga University of Arts.

From 1987 he lived between France and Japan, teaching shodō to students and artists in Lyon (France), Milan (Italy) and Kyoto.

From 1998 until his death, he gave lectures at the Japanese Center in Lyon (53, rue de Montesquieu 69007) and in Switzerland, Italy, Netherlands, Germany and Belgium.

In 1998 he was invited by Radio France to do a special concert in the music festival "98 Presence". In this experimental concert, Tanaka improvised 24 works live on stage, responding to the images and inspirations of the music played by pianist Thierry Ravassard and composed by twenty French composers such as Gilbert Amy and Pascal Dusapant. Each composer chose one haiku from the 24 poems of the four seasons, and composed according to the image of the poem. This concert gained a good reputation, and three concerts were performed again at the National Supreme Academy of Music in Lyon. Muzzik European Channel decided to make a film of this music project for world-wide release, and beginning production from 2001 to 2002 through four seasons in Japan.

In Paris Tanaka collaborated with the musician of crystal sound, Michel Deneuve. He also made some other experimental performances with music, called "music and the art of the moment" in the Netherlands. He also performed at St. Jean Cathedral in Lyon in December 2000. A concert also took place in October 2001 with two Japanese musicians of the traditional Yokobue (bamboo flute).

Tanaka exhibited worldwide and in 2005 he received Kyoto's Art and Culture Award.

About his life and work he wrote:

For me, to create an art work of shodō is to prove that I am worth living and that I can find my identity. I want to show, through my works, all that I feel and think about life and nature. The motif, namely the character by which I intend to express something, has an inevitable meaning for me in creating a work.
