= Baháʼí pilgrimage =

Pilgrimage to several Baháʼí sacred sites in Israel

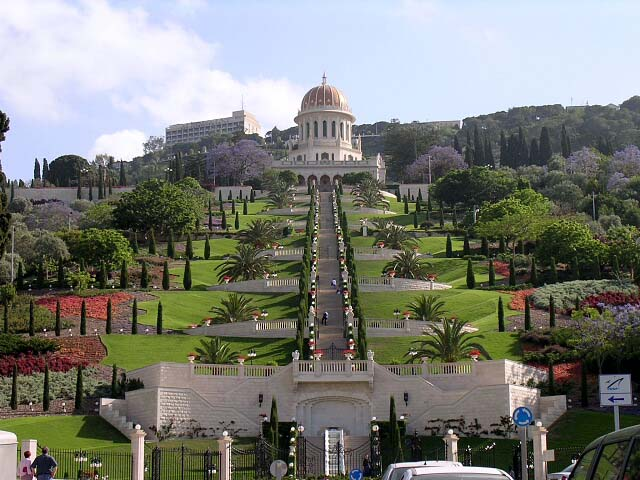
The Shrine of the Báb and its terraces.

A Baháʼí pilgrimage currently consists of visiting the holy places in Acre and Haifa at the Baháʼí World Centre in Northwest Israel. Baháʼís do not have access to other places designated as sites for pilgrimage.

Baháʼu'lláh decreed pilgrimage in the Kitáb-i-Aqdas to two places: the House of Baháʼu'lláh in Baghdad, and the Báb's house in Shiraz. In two separate tablets, known as Suriy-i-Hajj, he prescribed specific rites for each of these pilgrimages. It is obligatory to make the pilgrimage, "if one can afford it and is able to do so, and if no obstacle stands in one's way". Baháʼu'lláh has "exempted women as a mercy on His part", though the Universal House of Justice has clarified that women are free to perform this pilgrimage. Baháʼís are free to choose between the two houses, as either has been deemed sufficient. Later, ʻAbdu'l-Bahá designated the Shrine of Baháʼu'lláh at Bahjí (the Qiblih) as a site of pilgrimage. No rites have been prescribed for this.

The designated sites for pilgrimage are not accessible to the majority of Baháʼís, as they are in Iraq and Iran respectively, and thus when Baháʼís currently refer to pilgrimage, it refers to a nine-day pilgrimage that occurs at the Baháʼí World Centre in Haifa and Akká in Israel. This nine-day pilgrimage does not replace pilgrimage to the designated sites for pilgrimage, and it is intended that pilgrimage to the House of the Báb and the House of Baháʼu'lláh will occur in the future.

== Current nine-day pilgrimage ==
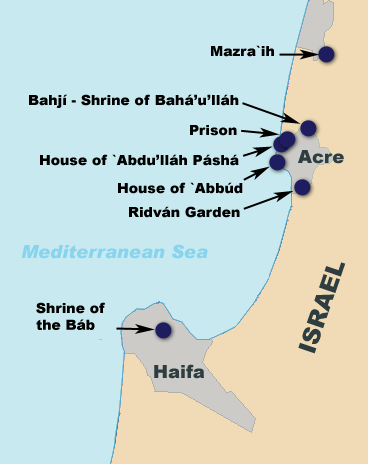
Baháʼí pilgrimage locations

The places that Baháʼís visit on the current nine-day pilgrimage at the Baháʼí World Centre include the following. (Baháʼí World Centre buildings contains additional information.)

Bahjí:

- Shrine of Baháʼu'lláh
- Mansion of Bahjí

Haifa:

- Shrine of the Báb
- Baháʼí Terraces
- Arc
  - Seat of the Universal House of Justice
  - International Teaching Centre Building
  - Centre for the Study of the Sacred Texts
  - International Archives
- Monument Gardens
- Site of the future House of Worship
- House of ʻAbdu'l-Bahá
- Resting place of Amatu'l-Bahá Rúhíyyih Khanum
- Pilgrim Houses:
  - Eastern Pilgrim House
  - 10 Haparsim Street
  - 4 Haparsim Street

Akká:

- Garden of Ridván, Akká
- House of ʻAbbúd
- House of ʻAbdu'lláh Páshá
- Mazra'ih

The nine-day pilgrimage is open only to Baháʼís and their spouses who have applied to go on pilgrimage. Due to limited space at the Baháʼí holy sites, a maximum of 500 Baháʼís at one time are allowed to visit Haifa. Baháʼís have to wait up to six years to come and are only allowed to visit again after another five-year wait.

== Future pilgrimage sites ==
A new shrine in Acre, Israel is under construction since 2019, where the remains of ʻAbdu'l-Bahá will be reinterred. This place will serve as a pilgrimage site for the Baháʼís in the future.

== See also ==
- Montréal Bahá'í Shrine
