= Baháʼí World Centre buildings =

Site in Haifa and Acre, Israel

Baháʼí Holy Places in Haifa and the Western Galilee
UNESCO World Heritage Site
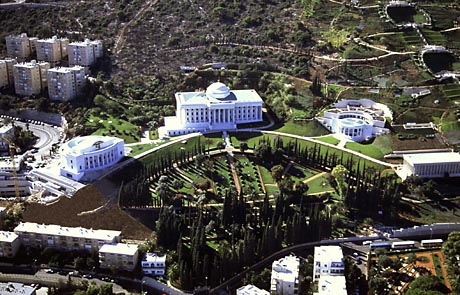
- Aerial view of the complex of Baháʼí administrative buildings on Mt. Carmel, Haifa, Israel

- Location within Israel Location within West and Central Asia
- Location: Israel
- Criteria: Cultural: (iii), (vi)
- Reference: 1220rev
- Inscription: 2008 (32nd Session)
- Area: 62.58 ha (154.6 acres)
- Buffer zone: 254.7 ha (629 acres)
- Coordinates: 32°48′44″N 34°59′11″E

The Baháʼí World Centre buildings are buildings that are part of the Baháʼí World Centre in Israel. The Baháʼí World Centre buildings include both the Baháʼí holy places used for pilgrimage and the international administrative bodies of the Baháʼí Faith; they comprise more than 20 different administrative offices, pilgrim buildings, libraries, archives, historical residences, and shrines. These structures are all set amidst more than 30 different gardens or individual terraces.

The buildings themselves are located in Haifa, Acre, and Bahjí, Israel. The location of the Baháʼí World Centre buildings has its roots in Baháʼu'lláh's imprisonment in Acre, which is near Haifa, by the Ottoman Empire during the period of Ottoman rule over Palestine, now Israel.

Many Baháʼí holy places in Haifa and around Acre, including the terraces and the Shrine of the Báb on the north slope on Mount Carmel, and the Shrine of Baháʼu'lláh, the Mansion of Bahji, and the Mansion at Mazra'ih were inscribed on the World Heritage List in July 2008. The Baháʼí shrines "are the first sites connected with a relatively new religious tradition to be recognized by the World Heritage List." The UNESCO World Heritage Committee considers the sites to be "of outstanding universal value [and]...inscribed for the testimony they provide to the Baháʼí's strong tradition of pilgrimage and for their profound meaning for the faith."

== Haifa ==
Haifa is the third-largest city in Israel, and it is a seaport, located below and on Mount Carmel, and lies on the Mediterranean coast. In 1891 Baháʼu'lláh himself designated Mount Carmel as the location for the Shrine of the Báb. Later, Baháʼu'lláh in the Tablet of Carmel wrote that Mount Carmel would be the physical location of the Baháʼí World Centre.

=== Shrine of the Báb ===
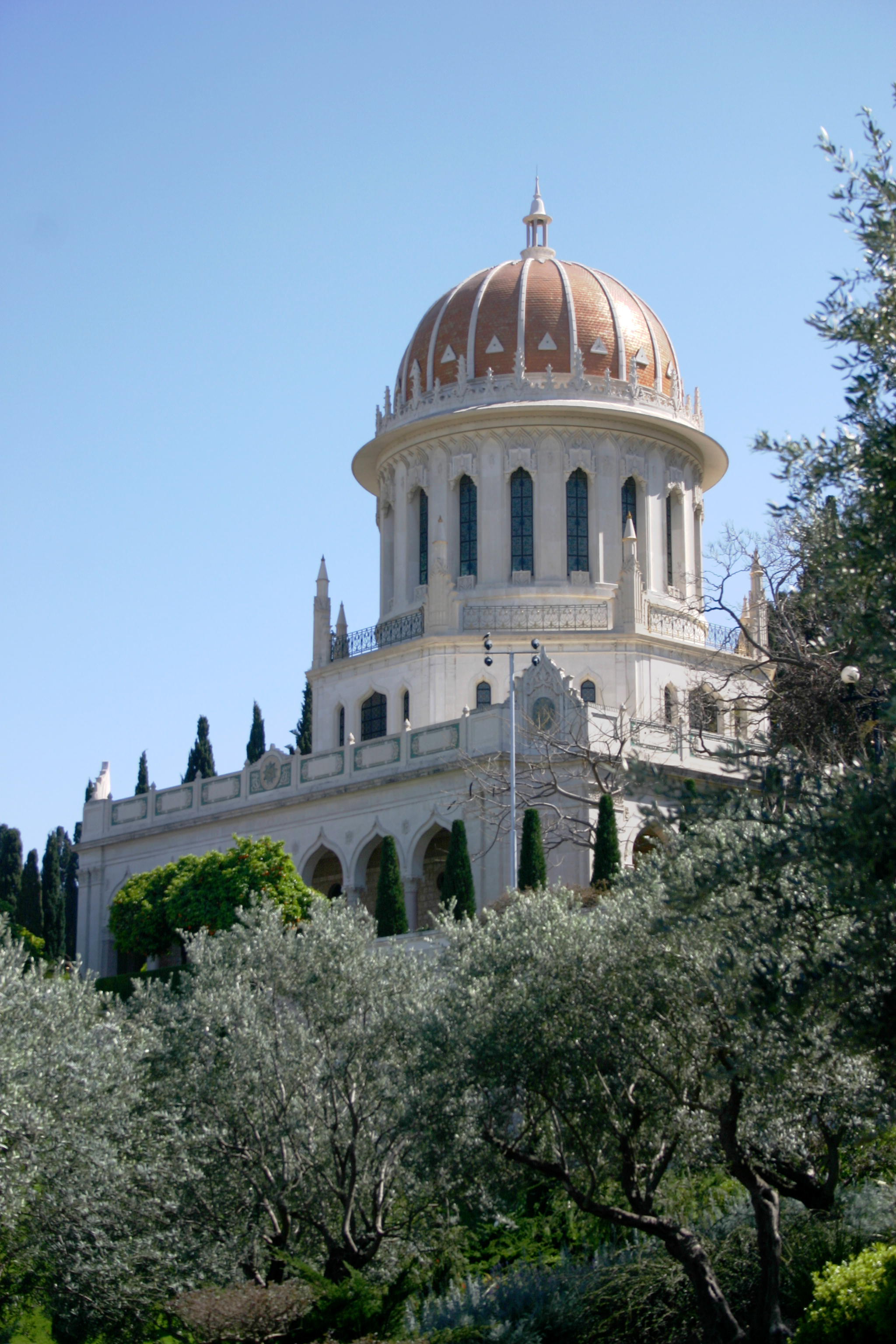
Shrine of the Báb

The Shrine of the Báb is the location where the Báb's remains have been finally laid to rest. The location was designated by Baháʼu'lláh himself in 1891 while he was camped, with ʻAbdu'l-Bahá, on Mount Carmel. The location is right above the German Colony, which was established in the 1860s by the German Templer Society, who were working for the Kingdom of God on earth. The initial shrine was built by ʻAbdu'l-Bahá and completed in 1909. Many years later, the superstructure was completed by Shoghi Effendi, and finally dedicated in 1953.

The architect was William Sutherland Maxwell, a Canadian Baháʼí who was a Beaux-Arts architect and the father-in-law of Shoghi Effendi. Shoghi Effendi provided overall guidance, including in the use of Western and Eastern styles, but left the artistic details to Maxwell. Maxwell's design of the Rose Baveno granite colonnade, Oriental-style Chiampo stone arches, and golden dome is meant to harmonize Eastern and Western proportions and style. Some remaining aspects of the dome's structural engineering were designed by Professor H. Neumann of Haifa's Technion University.

After Maxwell died in 1952, Leroy Ioas, an American Baháʼí who had been closely associated with the construction of the Baháʼí House of Worship in Wilmette, Illinois helped Shoghi Effendi in the construction process. Ioas employed his administrative skills and practical mind to supervise the building of the drum and dome, a task done without the availability of sophisticated machinery.

==== Temporary Shrine of ʻAbdu'l-Bahá ====
The Shrine of ʻAbdu'l-Bahá is where ʻAbdu'l-Bahá is buried.

=== The Arc ===
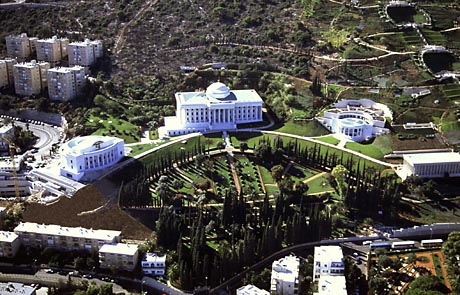
Aerial view of the complex of the Baháʼí arc on Mt. Carmel. From left to right: International Teaching Centre, Seat of the Universal House of Justice, Centre for the Study of the Sacred Texts, and the International Archives building.

The Arc is a grouping of administrative buildings on the slopes of Mount Carmel. They include the Seat of the Universal House of Justice, the Seat of the International Teaching Centre, the International Archives, and the Centre for the Study of the Sacred Texts. A fifth building, the International Baháʼí Library, has yet to be built.

Baháʼu'lláh in his Tablet of Carmel wrote that God would "sail His Ark" on Mount Carmel and said the mountain will be "the seat of His throne." This statement was interpreted by Shoghi Effendi, the head of the Baháʼí Faith during the first half of the 20th century, as referring to the establishment of the Universal House of Justice, the governing body of the Baháʼís; connected with this establishment, the prophecy was linked to a number of administrative institutions that would be established on Mount Carmel. Shoghi Effendi decided that the buildings housing the institutions would be designed on an arc and surrounded by gardens. The fulcrum of arc would be Monument Gardens, which hold the graves of some of the members of the Baháʼí holy family.

The buildings include bomb shelters as required by law and an underground passage which connects the buildings.

==== International Archives ====
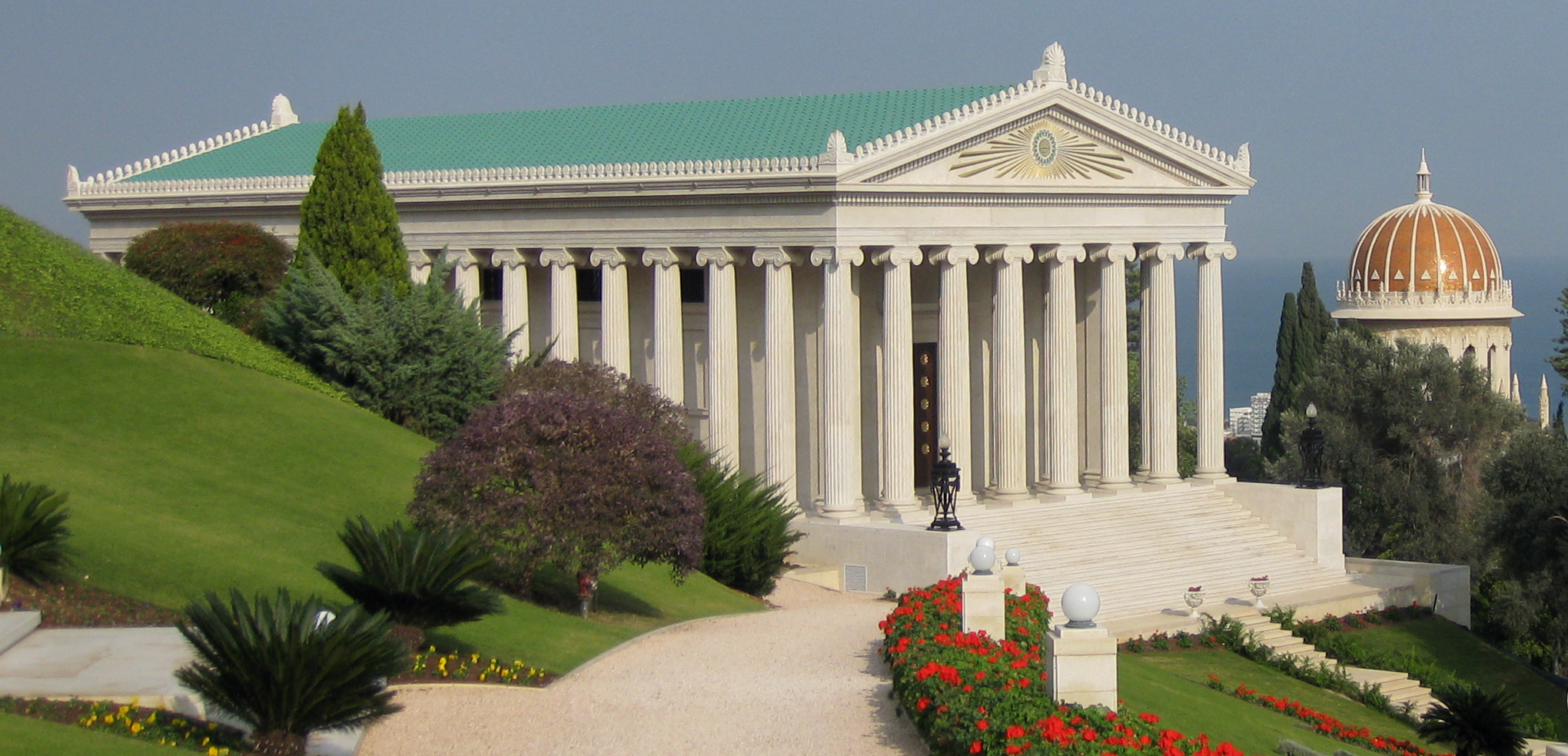
The International Archives

The International Archives is the first building to be built on the Arc and holds many of the most sacred items of the Baháʼí Faith, including the sword of Mullá Husayn, the photos of Baháʼu'lláh, and a painting of the Báb.

Shoghi Effendi chose the Parthenon as the basis for the design, possibly due to the apparent enduring beauty even after thousands of years. The capitals of the fifty columns were Ionic rather than the Doric Order. It was finished in 1957 however Shoghi Effendi never lived to furnish the interior. This was left to his wife Rúhíyyih Khanum.

Previously the rear three rooms of the Shrine of the Báb and then the building beside the Monument Gardens now called the Department of Holy Places were temporary Archives buildings.

==== Seat of the Universal House of Justice ====
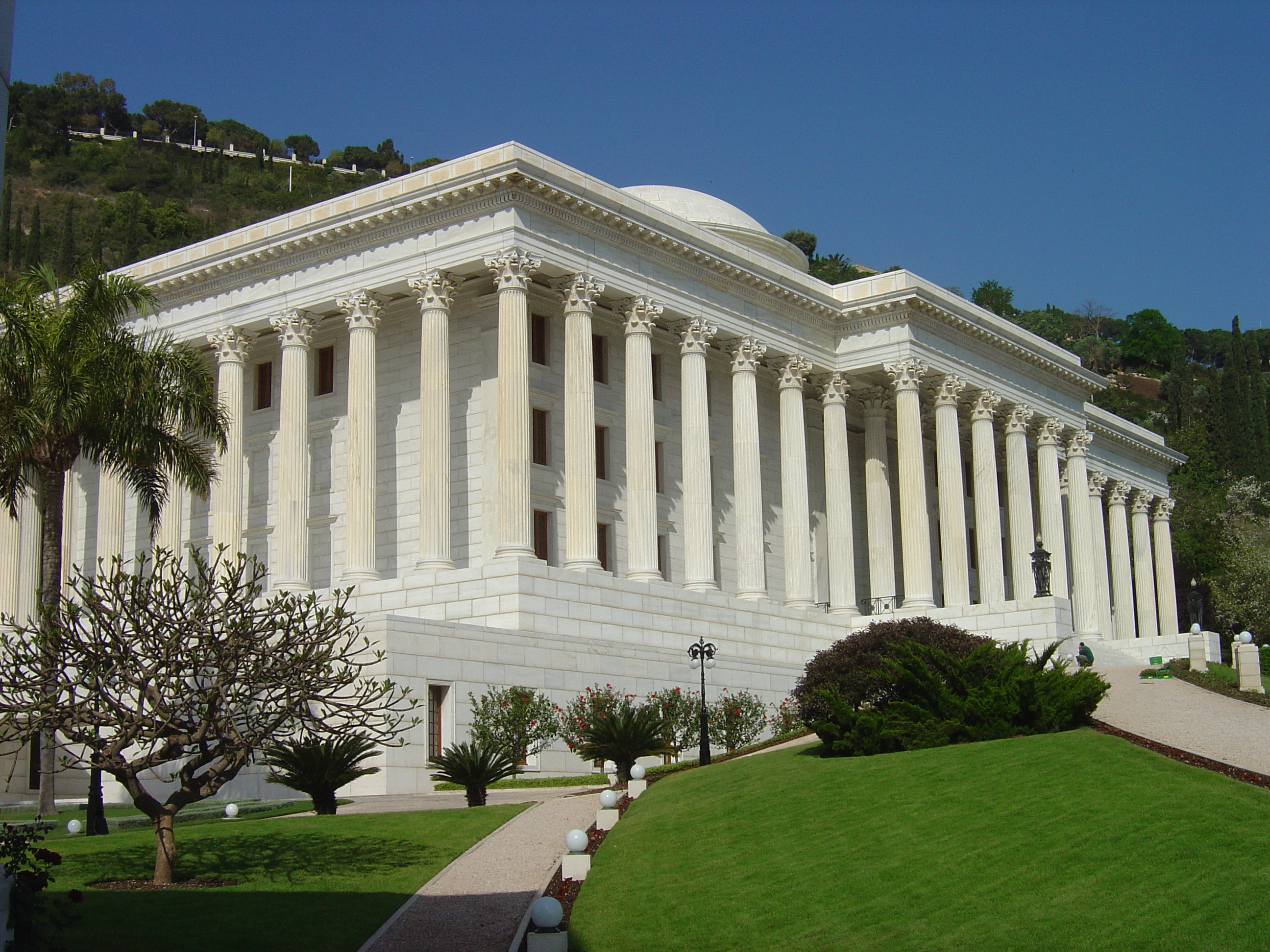
Seat of The Universal House of Justice.

The Seat of the Universal House of Justice is a large building located in Haifa, Israel, where the Universal House of Justice operates. It includes the chamber where the Universal House of Justice holds its meetings as well as a reception concourse, banquet room, reference library, and a few other offices of the Baháʼí World Centre.

The building is located at the apex of the Arc and has fifty-eight Corinthian columns around it to mirror the design of the International Archives. Planning for the building began in 1972, and in 1973 the architect Hossein Amanat was chosen. It was completed in 1982 during the second stage of building on the Arc, to be occupied in 1983.

==== International Teaching Centre Building ====
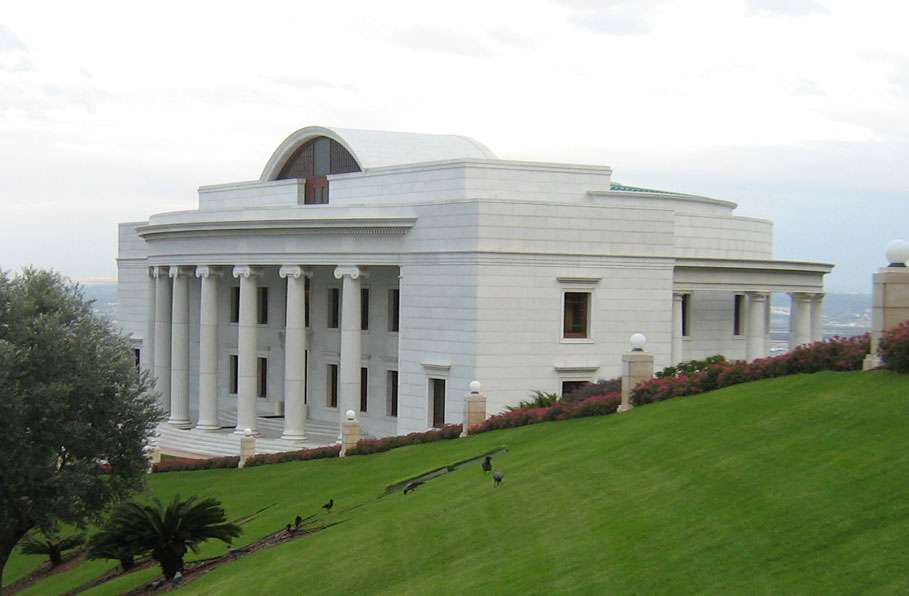
The International Teaching Centre Building

Built in the third stage of the building of the Arc, the International Teaching Centre Building is where the International Teaching Centre is based. The architect was Hossein Amanat. Its construction was announced in 1987 and it was completed in 2000.

==== Centre for the Study of the Sacred Texts ====
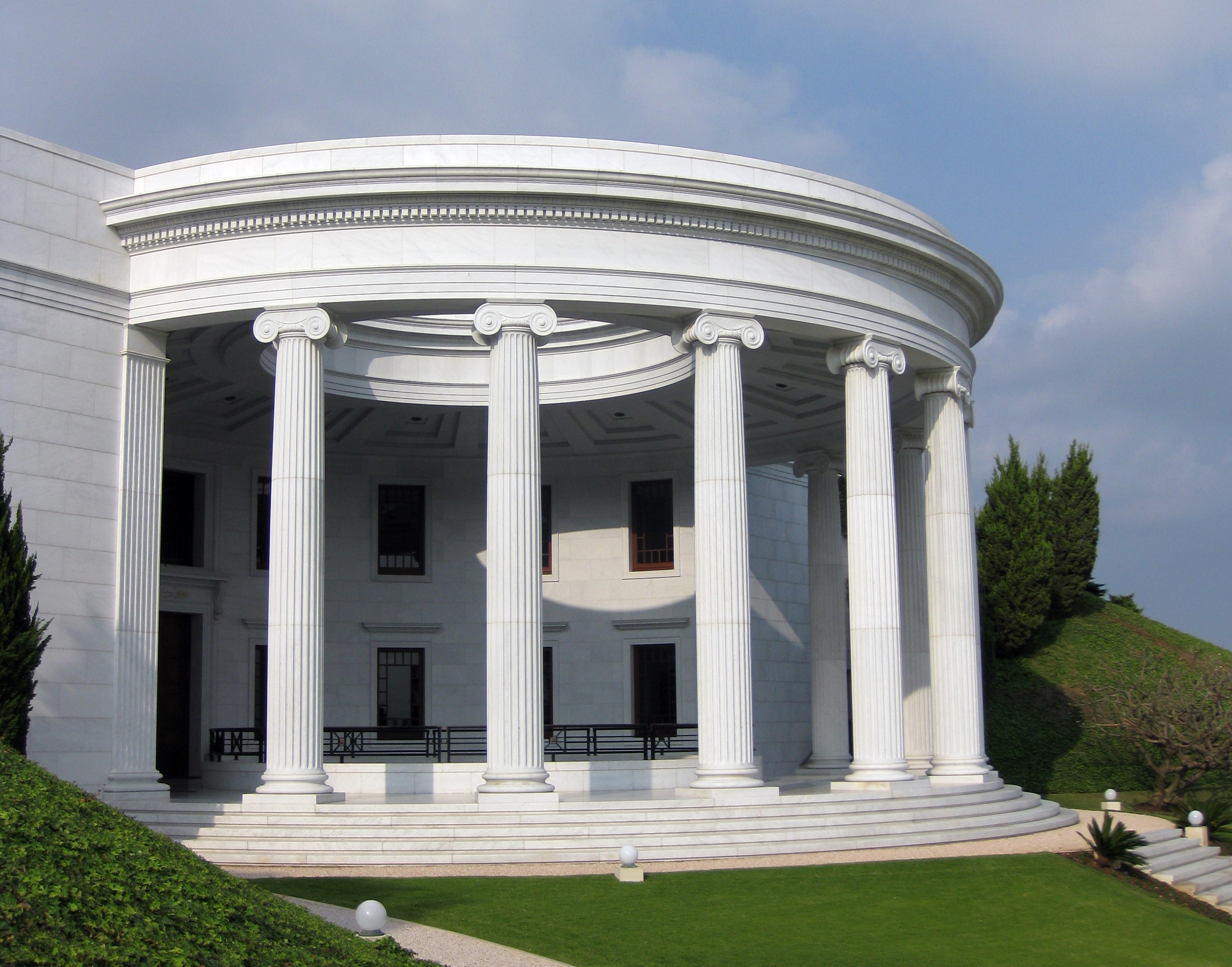
Centre for the Study of the Sacred Texts

Built in the third stage of the building of the Arc, the Centre for the Study of the Sacred Texts is the base for the scholars and translators who study and translate the Baháʼí texts to assist the Universal House of Justice. The architect was Hossein Amanat and it was completed in 1999.

==== International Baháʼí Library Building ====
The International Baháʼí Library Building, specified by Shoghi Effendi, is not yet built. The Baháʼí World Centre Library holds an extensive collection of Baháʼí literature. The Universal House of Justice stated: "In future decades its functions must grow, it will serve as an active centre for knowledge in all fields, and it will become the kernel of great institutions of scientific investigation and discovery."

==== Monument Gardens ====
The Monument Gardens are a set of gardens that hold the graves of some of the members of the family of Baháʼu'lláh. The grave monuments are at the fulcrum of the arc of administrative buildings, located downhill from the seat of the Universal House of Justice. They were constructed by Shoghi Effendi between 1932 and 1939.

Graves include those of

- Ásíyih Khánum (Navváb; 1820 - 1886) — Baháʼu'lláh's first wife
- Bahíyyih Khánum (1846 - 1932) — Baháʼu'lláh's daughter
- Mirzá Mihdí (1848 - 1870) — Baháʼu'lláh's youngest son from his first wife
- Munirih Khánum (1847 - 1938) — ʻAbdu'l-Bahá's wife
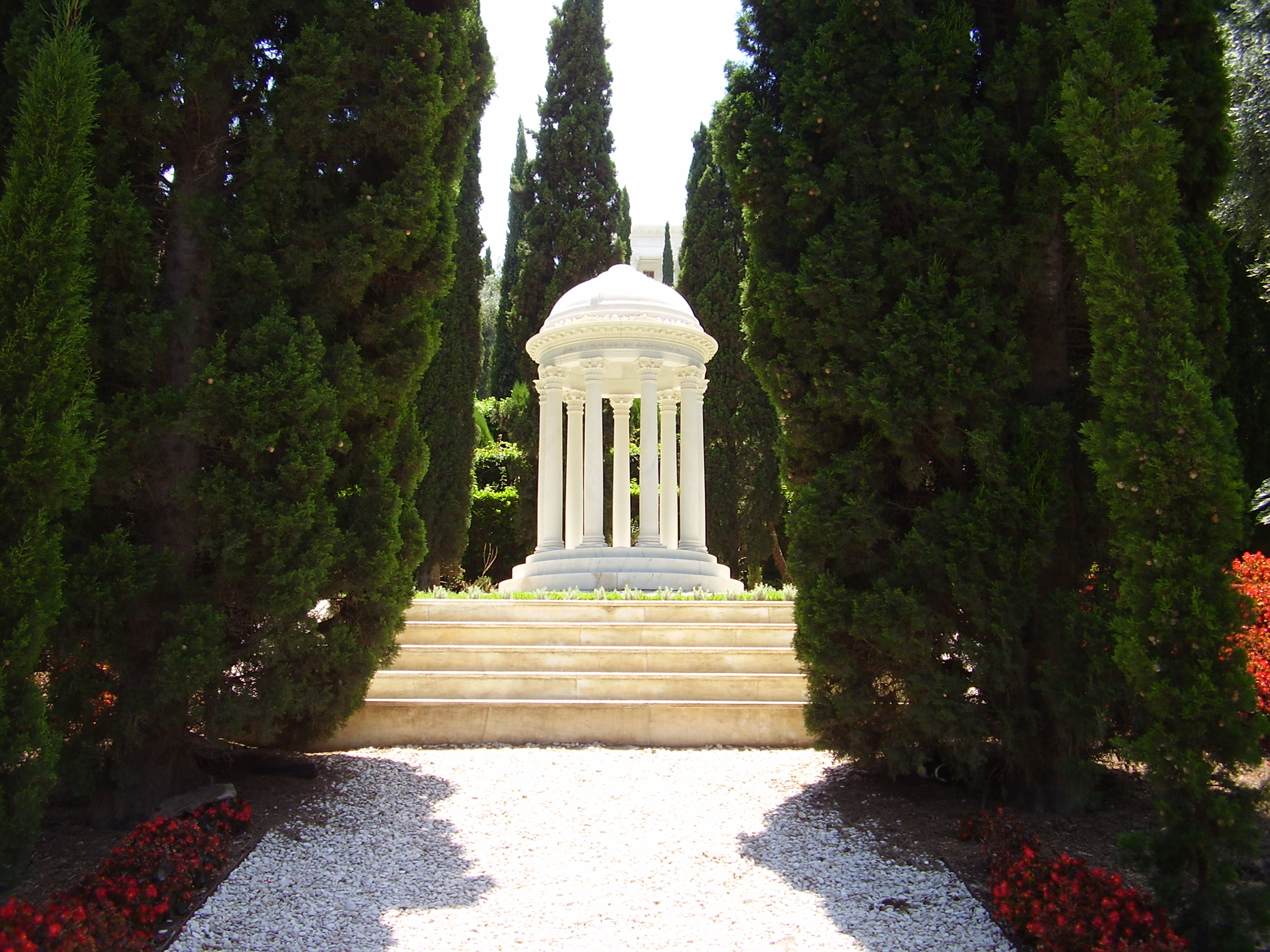
The grave of Bahíyyih Khánum within the Monument Gardens.

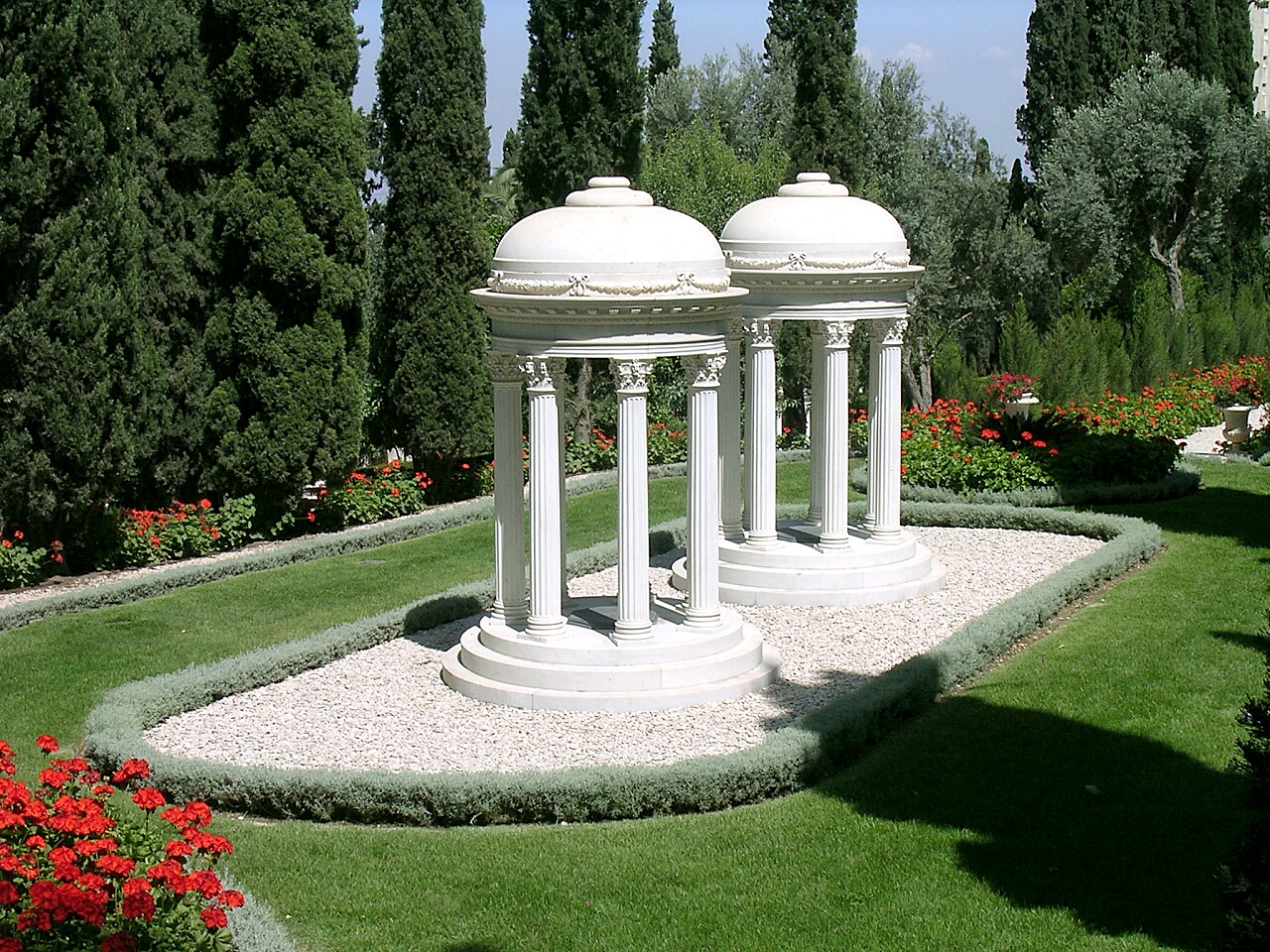
The graves of Navváb and Mirzá Mihdí within the Monument Gardens.

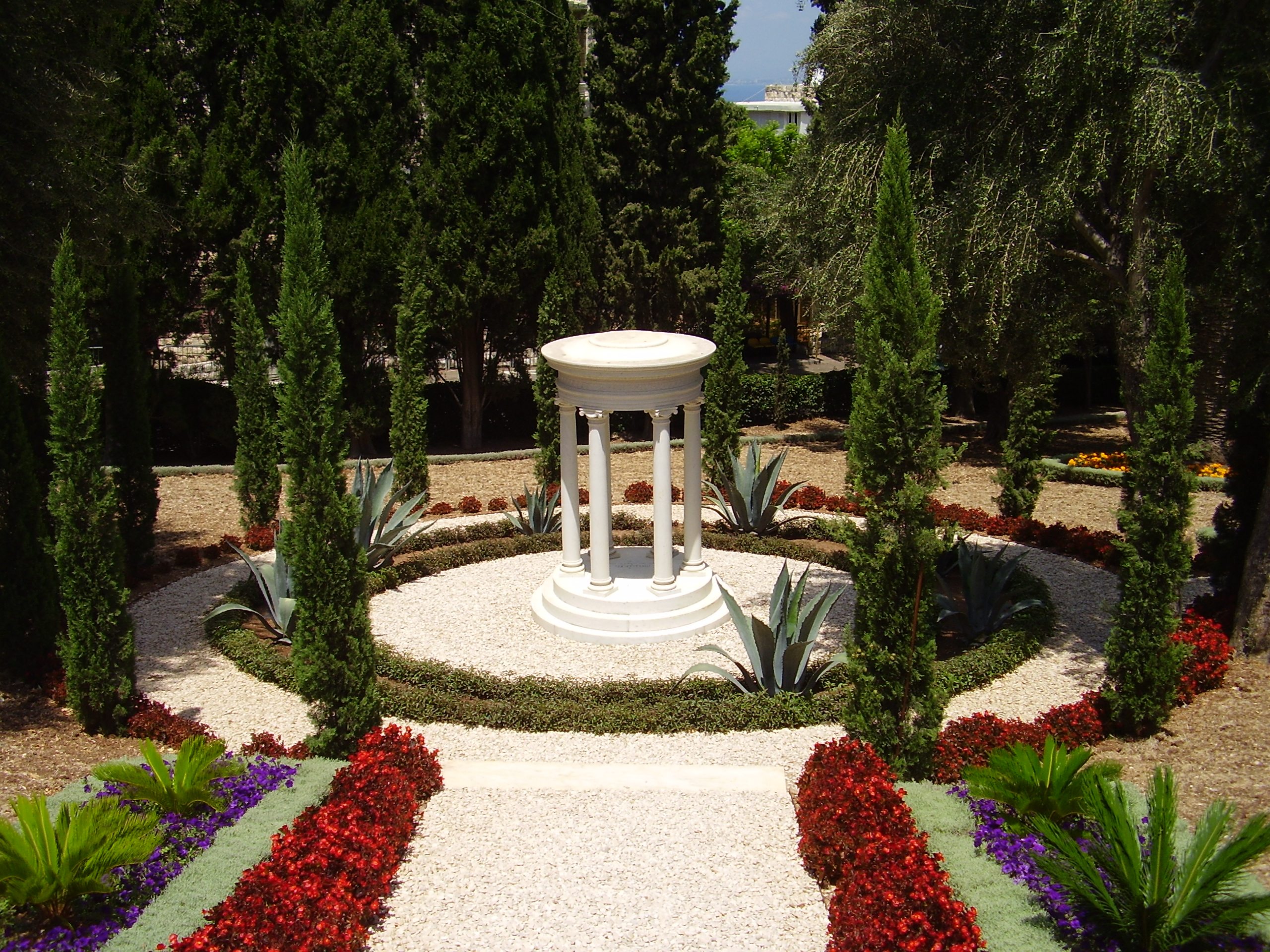
The grave of Munírih Khánum within the Monument Gardens.

=== Terraces ===
The Terraces are 18+1 garden terraces accompanying the Shrine of the Báb on Mount Carmel, with nine located above the Shrine, one around it, and nine below it.

Nine concentric circles provide the main geometry of the eighteen terraces. Just as the identification of a circle presupposes a centre, so the terraces have been conceived as generated from the Shrine of the Báb. The eighteen terraces plus the one terrace of the Shrine of the Báb make nineteen terraces in total. Nineteen is a significant number within both the Baháʼí and Bábí religions.

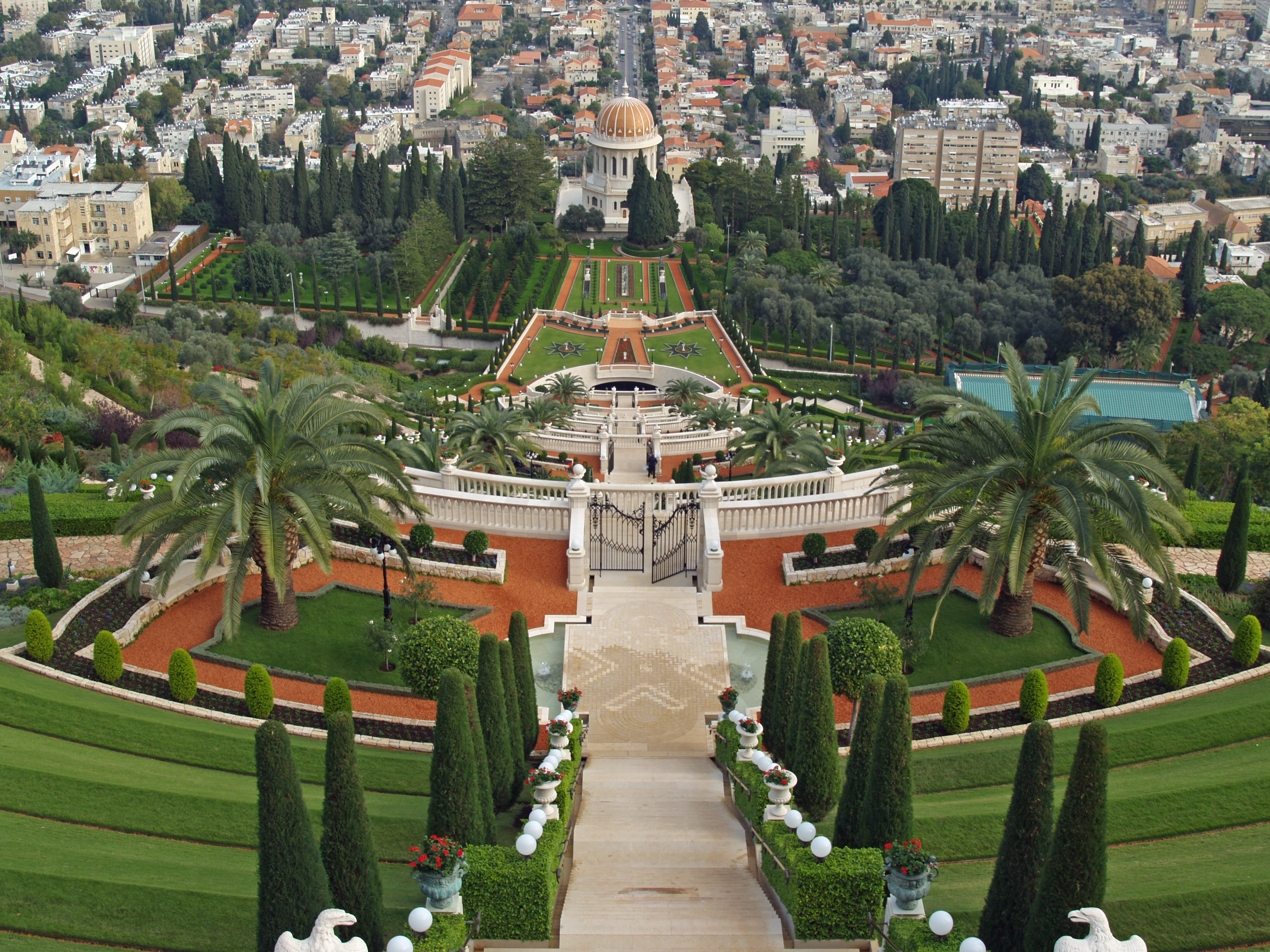
Baháʼí gardens in Haifa

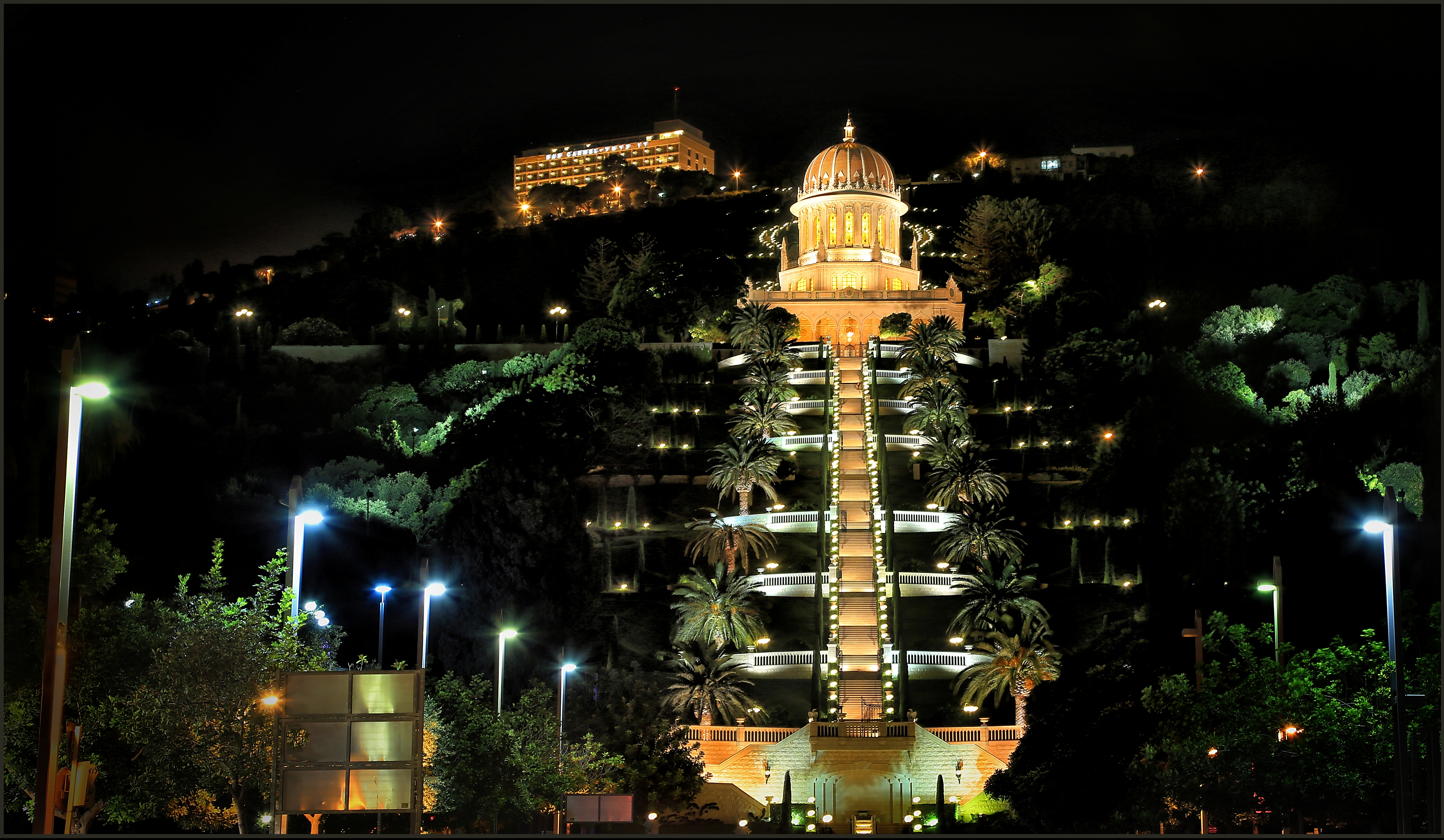
Terraces at night

==== Visitors Centre ====
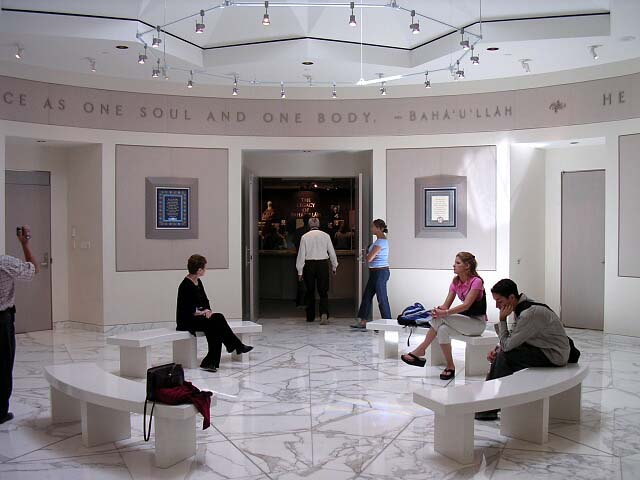
The Terraces Visitors Centre

The Visitors Centre is an underground structure on the 11th terrace behind the Shrine of the Báb on Mount Carmel.. It can be found on street level under the Hatzionut Bridge which the terraces pass over.

=== House of ʻAbdu'l-Bahá ===
'Abdu'l-Bahá, who was the head of the Baháʼí Faith from 1892 to 1921, designed and built a house in Haifa on 7 Haparsim (Persian) Street after his father Baháʼu'lláh died. It was completed in 1908, and ʻAbdu'l-Bahá moved to the house in August 1910. It became his official residence. After his travels to the West, it became the place for the reception of pilgrims to the Baháʼí World Centre. The election of the first Universal House of Justice occurred in this house in 1963.

=== Pilgrim Houses ===
Pilgrim Houses signify buildings where pilgrims are (or were) greeted and housed during pilgrimage to the Baháʼí holy places. There have been numerous buildings dedicated as Baháʼí pilgrim houses in the Haifa area.

==== Original Western Pilgrim House ====
The original Western Pilgrim House, located at 4 Haparsim (Persian) Street in Haifa, Israel, was used as a Pilgrim House for Baháʼís of Western origin, who had come for pilgrimage during the early years of the 20th century, before it was replaced by the new Western Pilgrim House on 10 Haparsim Street.

The house is currently part of the Baháʼí World Centre. While it was originally rented to serve as a Pilgrim House, the house was then bought by ʻAbdu'l-Bahá. After being replaced by a new Western Pilgrim House, the site was then used by members of the Baháʼí holy family. It left Baháʼí hands shortly before being re-bought by the Universal House of Justice.

==== Second Western Pilgrim House ====
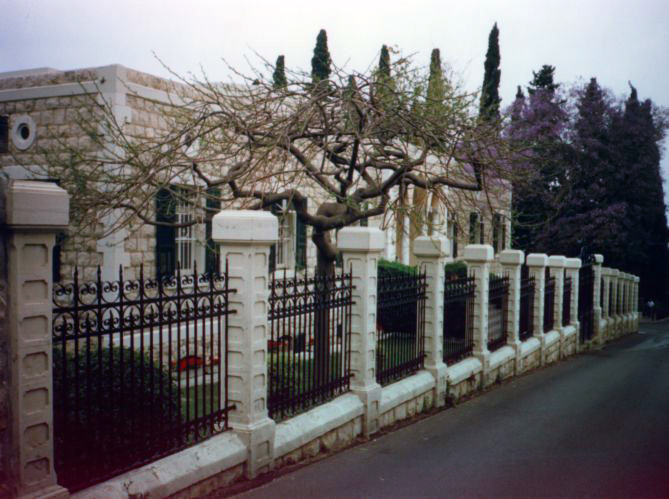
10 Haparsim Street

The second Western Pilgrim House, located at 10 Haparsim (lit. 'Persian') Street in Haifa, Israel, was used as a Pilgrim House for members of the Baháʼí Faith who had come for pilgrimage during the first half of the 20th century. It is currently part of the Baháʼí World Centre and used by the Baháʼí International Community Secretariat and related offices.

The house was originally paid for by William Harry Randall, a wealthy American Baháʼí, who felt the facilities of the previous Western Pilgrim House at 4 Haparsim were inadequate. Its construction was started under the instruction of ʻAbdu'l-Bahá, but was only completed during the time that Shoghi Effendi was the head of the Baháʼí Faith. Although it served originally as the Pilgrim House for western Baháʼís, it has been used for other purposes more recently:

- From 1951 to 1963 it housed the International Baháʼí Council;
- From 1963 to 1983 it served as the Seat of the Universal House of Justice;
- From 1983 to 2000 it was occupied by the International Teaching Centre.

==== Eastern Pilgrim House ====
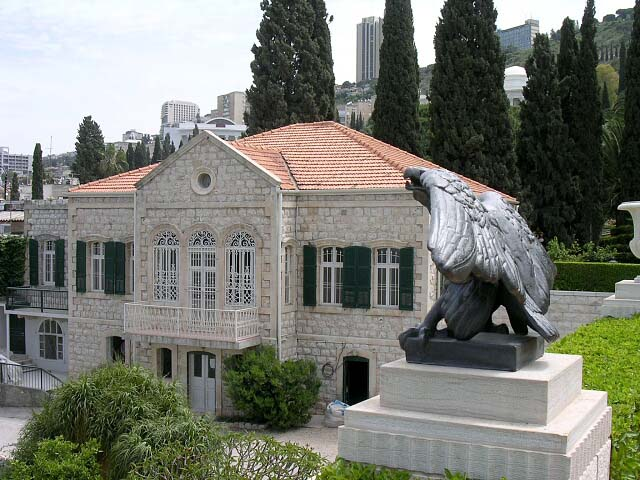
Haifa Pilgrim House

The Eastern Pilgrim House or the "Haifa Pilgrim House" is a Pilgrim House for Baháʼís when they go on pilgrimage. The house was built after ʻAbdu'l-Bahá interred the remains of the Báb on Mount Carmel. The construction of this stone building was supervised by Mírzá Jaʼfar Rahmání of ʻIshqábád, who also paid all the expenses. It is known as the "Eastern Pilgrim House", as for decades it housed the Persian pilgrims. After 1951, when the Western Pilgrim House at 10 Haparsim Street became the seat of the International Baháʼí Council, it became the Pilgrim House for all pilgrims.

==== Pilgrim Reception Centre ====
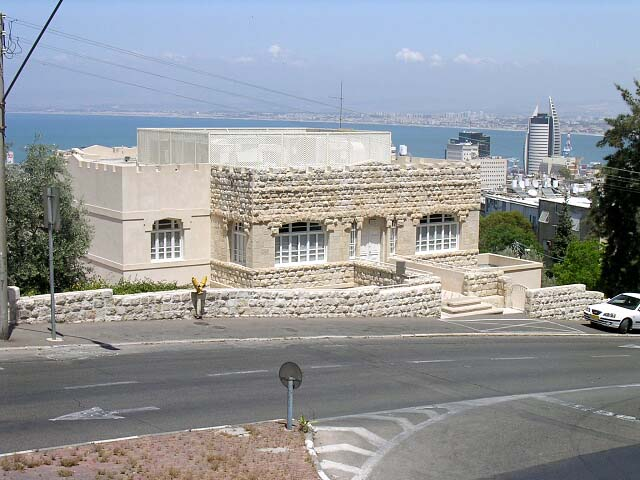
Haifa Pilgrim Reception Centre

The Pilgrim Reception Centre or the "Haifa Pilgrim Reception Centre" was the old Pilgrim Reception Centre for pilgrimage to sites near the Baháʼí World Centre. It comprised two conjoined buildings of a historic medical clinic, that had been remodeled and opened in October 2000. While open, the building could serve up to 500 people on pilgrimage. It has now been replaced by a newer Pilgrim Reception Center situated near the Shrine of the Bàb.

=== Resting place of Amatu'l-Bahá Rúhíyyih Khanum ===
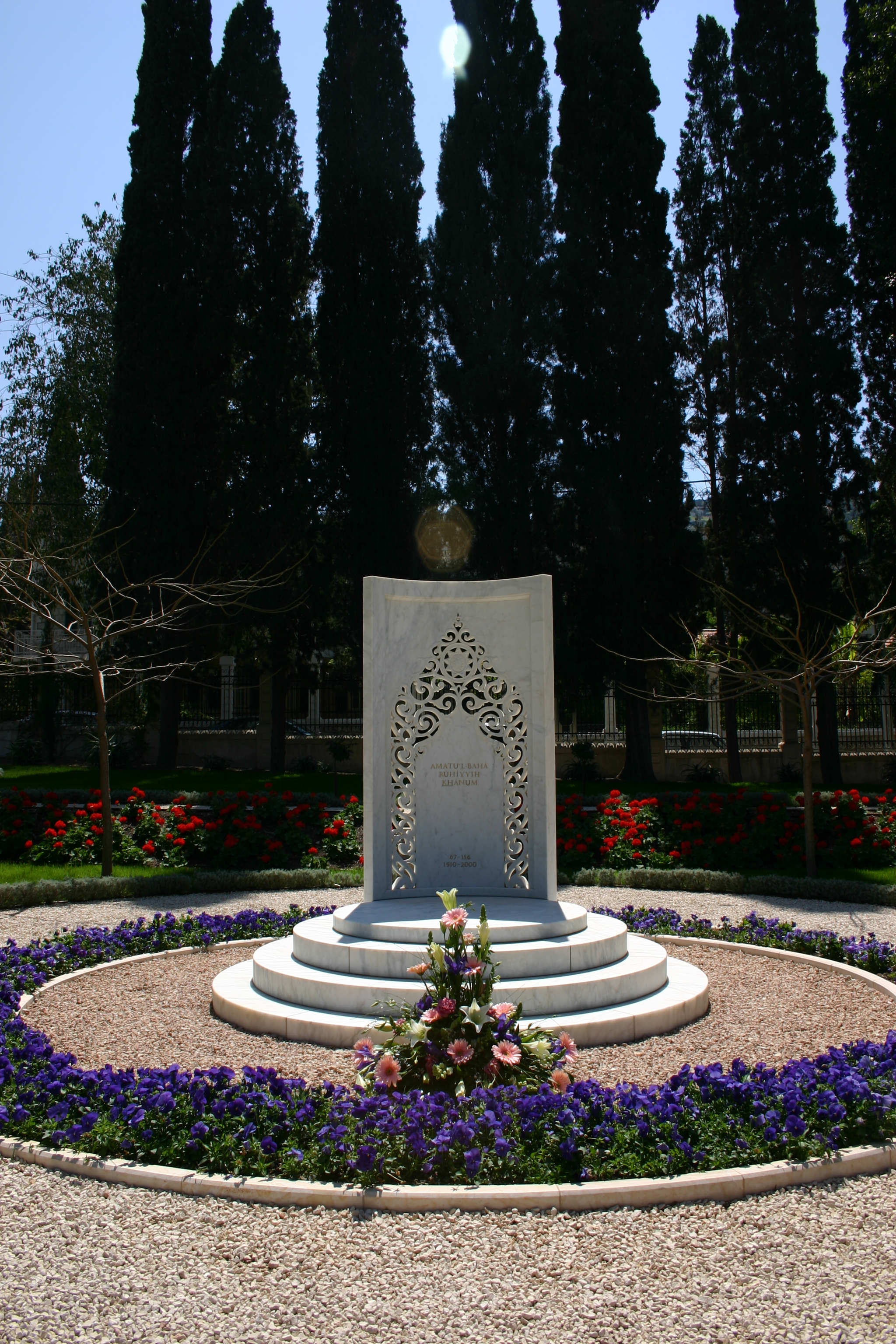
Resting place of Amatu'l-Bahá Rúhíyyih Khanum.

The Resting place of Amatu'l-Bahá Rúhíyyih Khanum is situated within Haifa, Israel as part of the Baháʼí World Centre. Originally bought to make sure that the area around the House of ʻAbdu'l-Bahá was not built up, and used as a garden, it was selected as the burial ground for Amatu'l-Bahá Rúhíyyih Khanum after she died in 2000.

=== 75 Hatzionut Avenue ===
75 Hatzionut Avenue is a building within Haifa which is part of the Baháʼí World Centre that is not particularly celebrated but has been an integral part of the centre for many years. Amongst other things it has been used for:

- A building where Shoghi Effendi oversaw the development of the Baháʼí gardens.
- An architect's office for the building of the Arc.
- As the International Archives building before the permanent building was finished in 1957.

It is currently used as the Baháʼí "Department of Holy Places".

=== Site of future temple ===
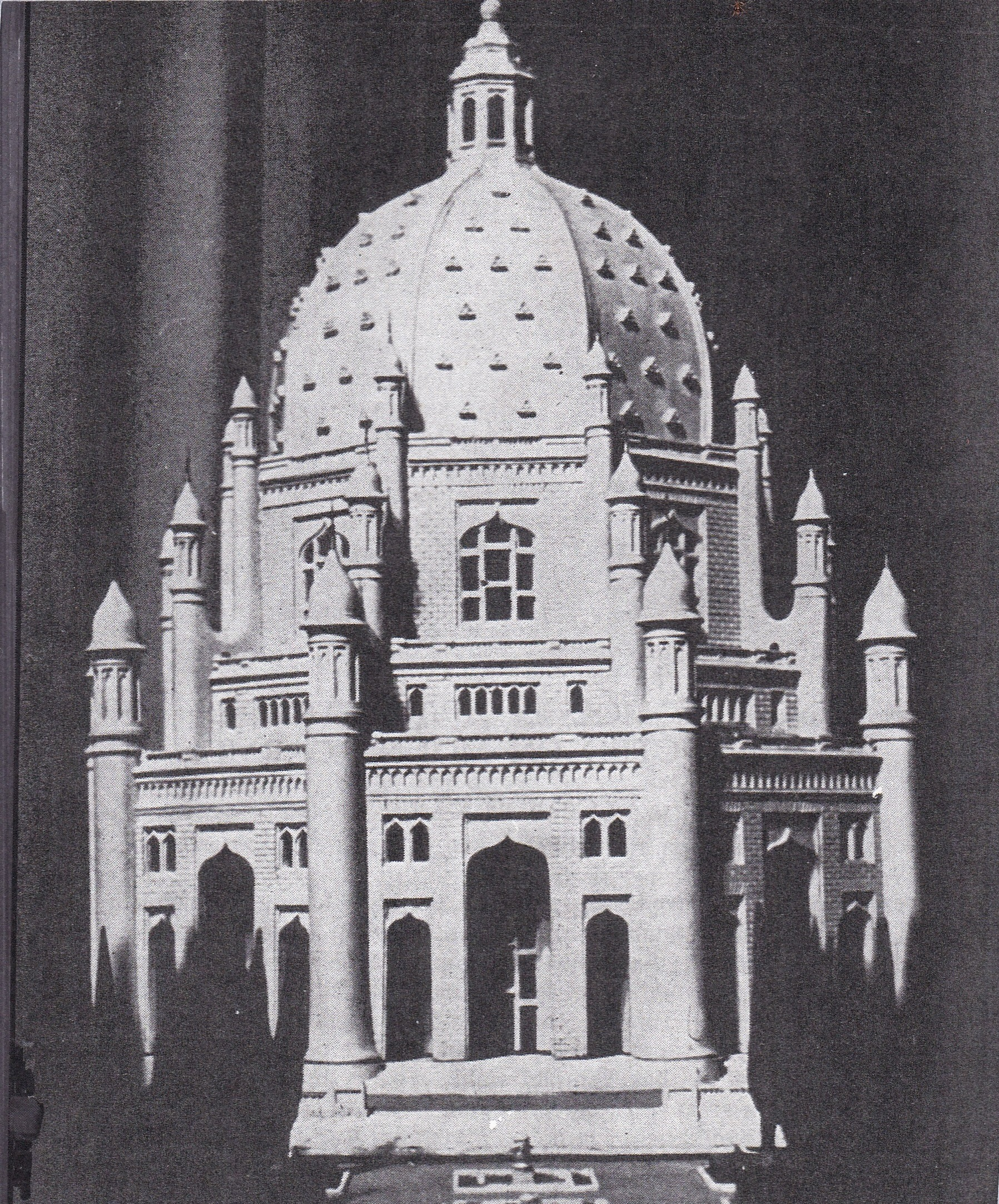
Model of proposed House of Worship on Mount Carmel

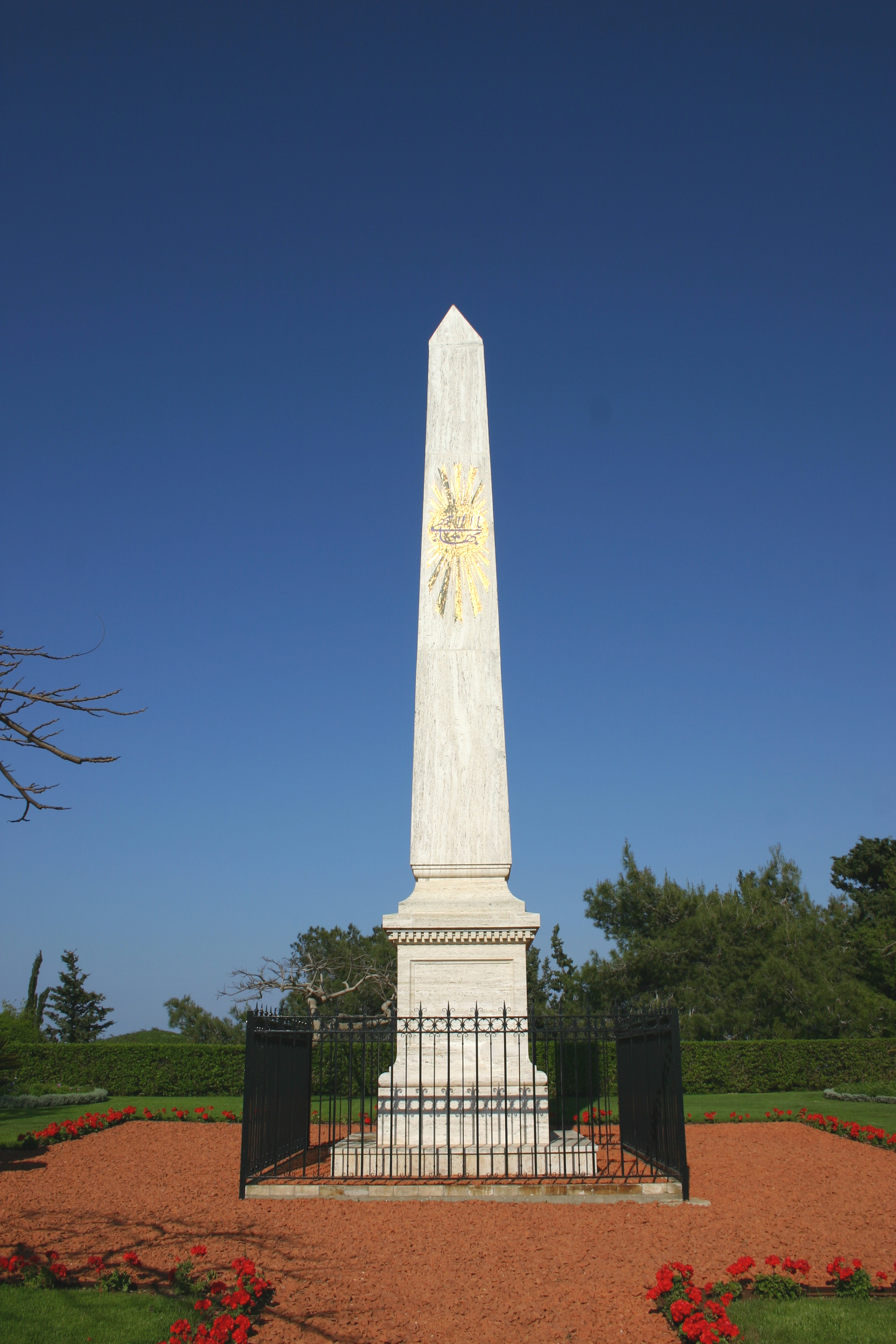
Obelisk marking the position of the future Bahá'í House of Worship

A site has been selected for a Baháʼí House of Worship on Mount Carmel. About two thirds of the way from the terraces to the head of the mountain, land was purchased by Shoghi Effendi. In August 1971 the Universal House of Justice erected an obelisk on the site, on the side of which is the Greatest Name. The land is near the intersection of David Marcus St and Hatsav St.

== Akká area ==
Baháʼu'lláh, and his family, were exiled to the prison city of Akká, known in English as Acre, by the Ottoman Sultan Abdulaziz. Baháʼu'lláh arrived in Akká on 31 August 1868, and lived the rest of his life in the Akká area as a prisoner. His prison conditions were eased in June 1877 and while still a prisoner, he moved to Mazra'ih at that time. The Baháʼí buildings and property in Akká were rented or bought during this period of time.

=== House of ʻAbbúd ===
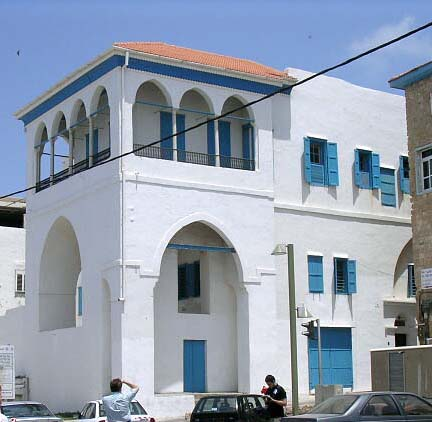
House of ʻAbbúd

The House of ʻAbbúd refers actually to two houses:

- The westerly house owned originally by ʻAbbúd himself. It was the first property to be rented after Baháʼu'lláh's release from confinement into house arrest.
- The easterly house which was owned by ʻÚdí Khammár originally until he let it to the Baháʼí holy family after a few years. ʻÚdí Khammár also owned the Mansion of Bahjí which the Baháʼís later acquired.

The house provided a home for Baháʼu'lláh's first wife Navváb and her family. It was in this building that the Kitáb-i-Aqdas was written.

=== House of ʻAbdu'lláh Páshá ===
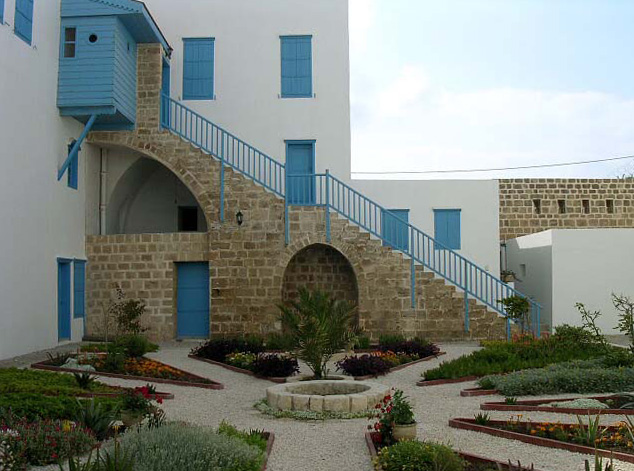
House of ʻAbdu'lláh Páshá

The House of ʻAbdu'lláh Páshá is one of the properties the Baháʼí holy family used in the Akká area. It was acquired by ʻAbdu'l-Bahá to fit the growing family and also provide space to welcome pilgrims who had started to arrive.

The name derives from the Egyptian governor, Ibrahim Pasha, who owned the house in the early decades of the 19th century.

The first western pilgrims were welcomed here on 10 December 1898.

=== Garden of Ridván ===
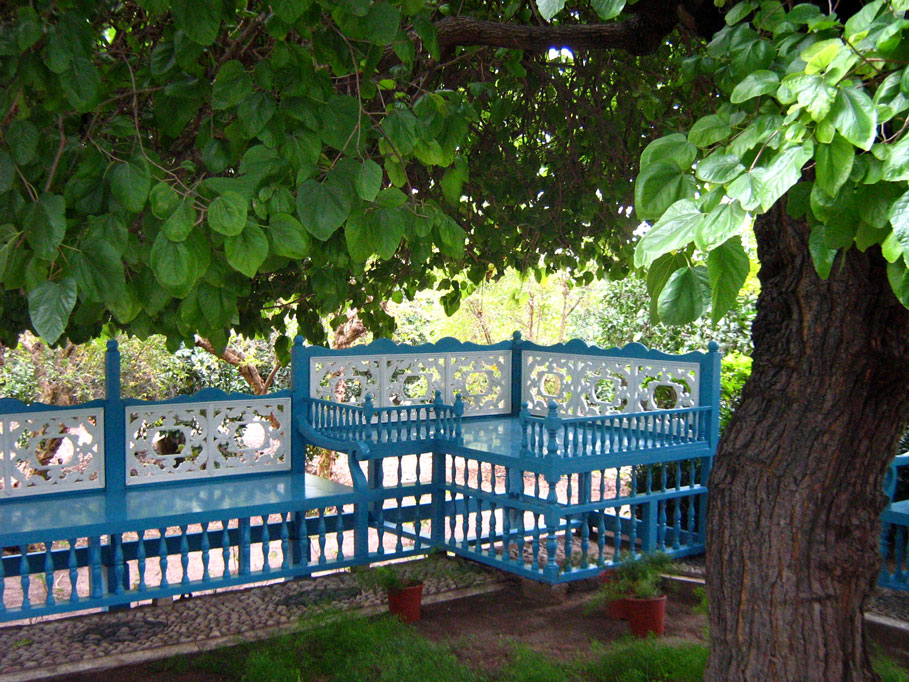
Garden of Ridván, Acre

The Garden of Ridván (lit. garden of paradise) is a Baháʼí holy place situated just outside Acre. Originally known as the 'garden of Naʻmayn', it was rented by ʻAbdu'l-Bahá for Baháʼu'lláh where he enjoyed spending the later part of his life, after years in a desolate prison cell. Although it shares the same name, it does not have the same significance of the Garden of Ridván, Baghdad and no connection to the festival of Ridván.

During the 1930s and 1940s the island setting of the garden disappeared, as a result of a draining project against malaria. In 2010 a three-year restoration and conservation project of the garden and the original water canals surrounding it was completed, after which the Ridvan Garden, referred to by Baháʼu'lláh as 'Our Verdant Isle', became an island once again.

In 2019, in its annual Ridván message, the Universal House of Justice announced that the future Shrine of ʻAbdu'l-Bahá is to be constructed in the vicinity of the Garden of Ridván.

=== Prison cell of Baháʼu'lláh ===
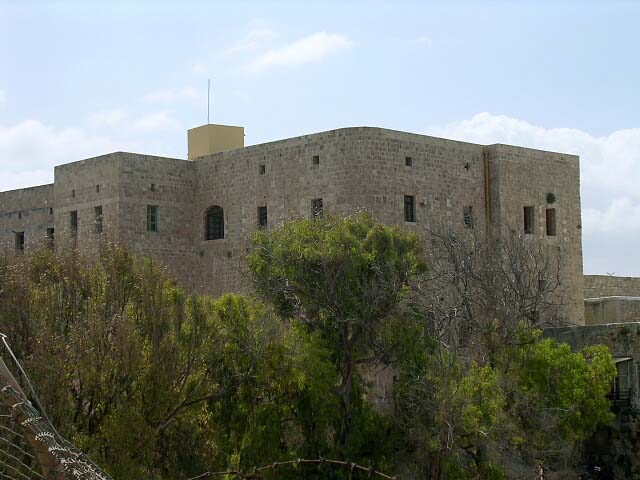
Prison Cell of Baháʼu'lláh, Acre

The prison cell in which Baháʼu'lláh lived between 1868 and 1870 has now become a Baháʼí pilgrimage location. Its restoration was completed in June 2004.

== Bahjí ==
Bahjí is a place near Akká (Acre), where Baháʼu'lláh spent his final years of life. While he was still formally a prisoner of the Ottoman Empire, his prison conditions were eased, and from 1879 he used the Mansion of Bahjí as his home.

Although the Mansion of Bahjí is relatively isolated, with only a small pilgrim house and the Shrine within several hundred metres, there used to be a complex of several buildings mostly used by the extended Holy family. During the time of Shoghi Effendi, these buildings (and the land around them which are now used as gardens) were bought up or traded for land near the Sea of Galilee. Several of the buildings were demolished as they had been used by covenant breakers. Tiles from the roofs were used to pave the garden pathways, and the material recovered from the razed buildings was used to construct a large windbreak to the northeast of the Mansion.

=== Shrine of Baháʼu'lláh ===
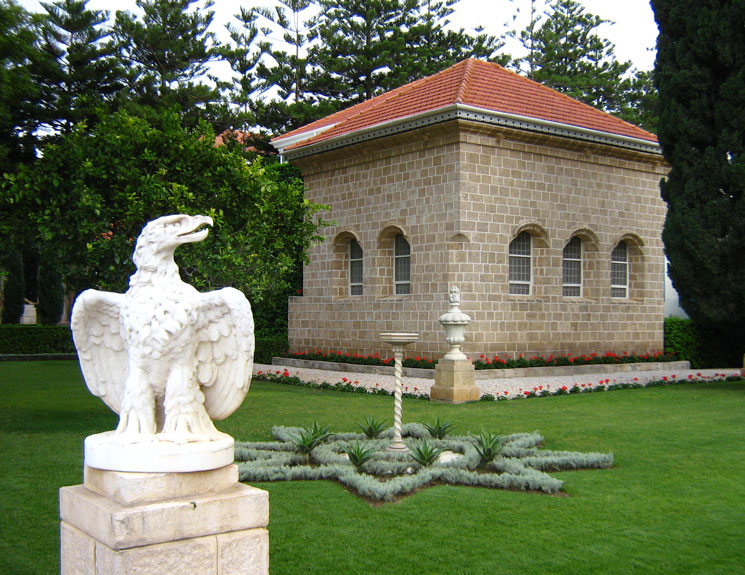
The Shrine of Baháʼu'lláh

Located in Bahjí, the Shrine of Baháʼu'lláh is the most holy place for Baháʼís — their Qiblih. It contains the remains of Baháʼu'lláh and is near the spot where he died in the Mansion of Bahjí.

=== Mansion of Bahjí ===
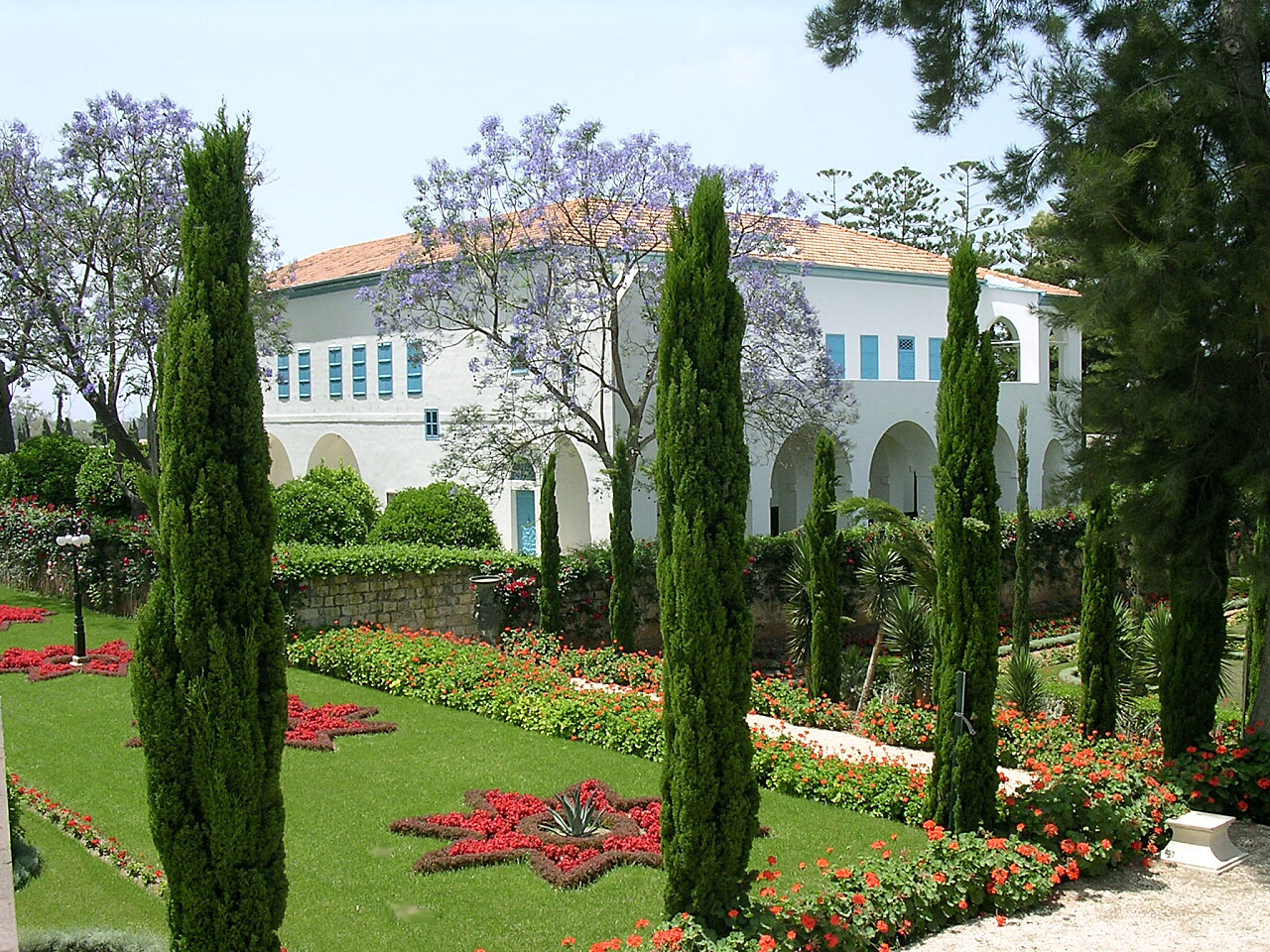
The Mansion of Bahjí

The Mansion of Bahjí is the house where Baháʼu'lláh died in 1892. It was built in 1870 over an earlier, smaller building by ʻUdi Khammar, a wealthy merchant from Akká who was also the original owner of the House of ʻAbbúd. It remained in his family's hands until 1879, when an epidemic caused the inhabitants to flee. The mansion was subsequently rented to the Baháʼí holy family for a very small amount of money. ʻUdi Khammar's tomb is still within the main Mansion compound, on the southeast corner of the wall. The Mansion is now a Baháʼí pilgrimage site.

=== Bahjí Visitor Centre ===
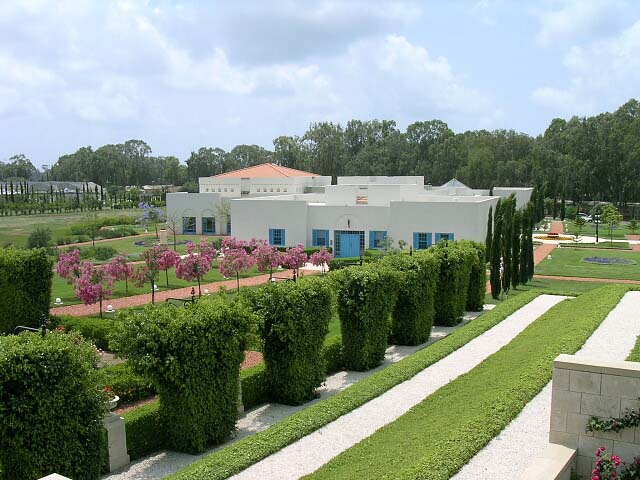
Bahjí Visitor Centre

Located in Bahjí and near the Shrine of Baháʼu'lláh, the Bahjí Visitor Centre contains basic facilities used by visitors and Baháʼí pilgrims.

== Mazra'ih ==
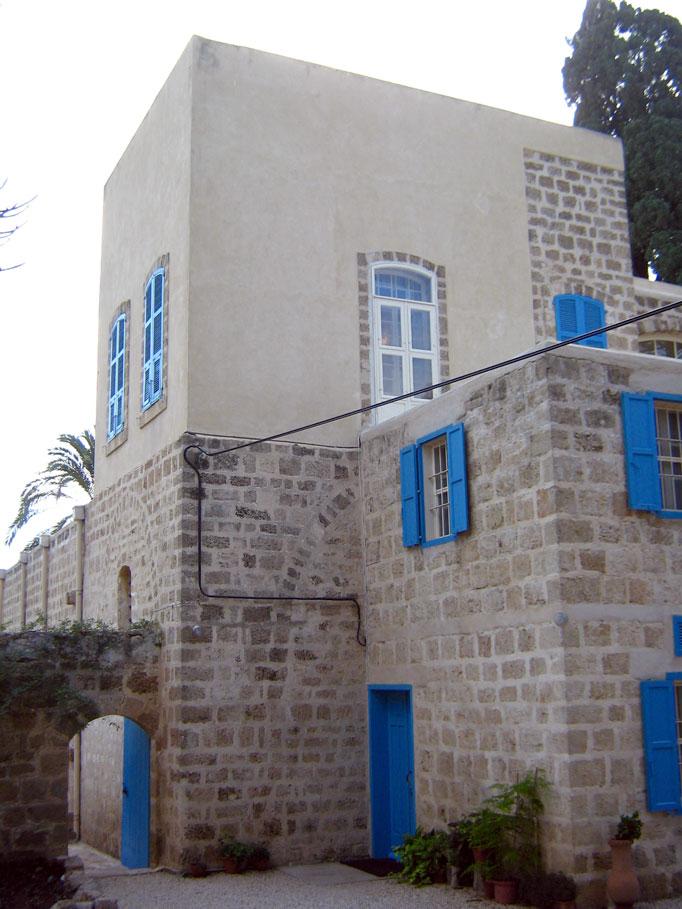
A side view of Mazra'ih. Baháʼu'lláh's quarters can be seen at the top where the walls are plastered.

Located four miles (6 km) north of Acre in Mazra'a, Baháʼu'lláh used this country house during the summers from June 1877 until 1879, before moving to a larger house within Bahjí. It left Baháʼí hands for several decades and was slightly restructured with an annex added to the front. This meant that a staircase, previously on the outside is now within the house's walls. It originally belonged to ʻAbdu'lláh Páshá.

Mazra'ih was transferred from a Muslim waqf to the Baháʼís subsequent to the establishment of the state of Israel.

"Masra'ih is a Moslem religious endowment, and it is consequently impossible, under existing laws in this country, for it to be sold. However, as the friends are aware, the Ministry of Religions, due to the direct intervention of the Minister himself, Rabbi Maimon, consented, in the face of considerable opposition, to deliver Masra'ih to the Baha'is as a Holy Place to be visited by Baha'i pilgrims. This means that we rent it from the Department of Moslem and Druze affairs in the Ministry of Religions. The head of this Department is also a Rabbi, Dr. Hirschberg. Recently he, his wife and party, visited all the Baha'i properties in Haifa and 'Akka, following upon a very pleasant tea party in the Western Pilgrim House with the members of the International Baha'i Council." (Baháʼí News, no. 244, June 1951, p. 4)

The mansion was ultimately purchased by the Baháʼís in 1973. An extensive restoration project of the house and the surrounding area is ongoing since 2020.
