= Shrine of Baháʼu'lláh =

Tomb of the founder of the Baháʼí Faith in Bahjí near Acre, Israel

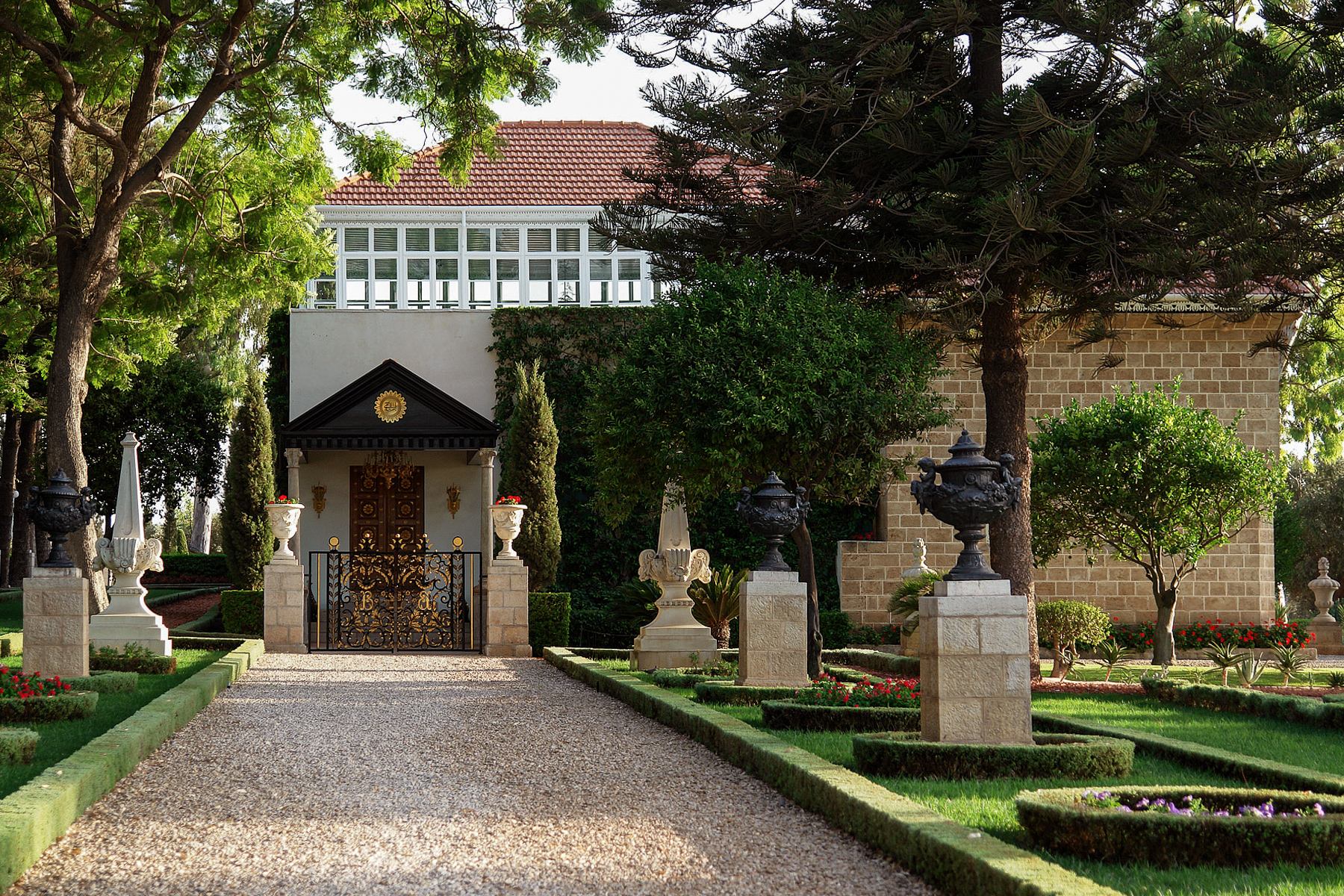
- The Shrine of Baháʼu'lláh at Bahjí
- Interactive map of Shrine of Baháʼu'lláh
- Location: Bahjí, Israel
- Coordinates: 32°56′36″N 35°05′32″E
- Type: Baháʼí
- Completion date: 1892
- Website: www.ganbahai.org.il

The Shrine of Baháʼu'lláh (Persian: آرامگاه حضرت بهاءاللّٰه, romanized: Ārāmgāh-i-Ḥaḍrat-i-Baháʼu'lláh; Arabic: مقام حضرة بهاء الله, romanized: Maqám Ḥaḍrat Baháʼu'lláh), known among Baháʼís as the Blessed Shrine (Persian: روضۀ مبارکه, romanized: Rawḍa-yi-Mubáraka), is the burial place of Baháʼu'lláh, the founder of the Baháʼí Faith. It stands at Bahjí, just north of Acre in northern Israel. Baháʼís regard it as the holiest site of their religion and as the Qiblih, the point they face during daily obligatory prayer. It is also a place of pilgrimage.

Baháʼu'lláh died at the Mansion of Bahjí before dawn on 29 May 1892 and was buried the same evening in an adjacent house belonging to his son-in-law; that house, a building separate from the Mansion, became the shrine. Its interior is arranged around a central area roofed with glass and crossed by carpeted paths, with the burial chamber at the north-western corner. The shrine and the Mansion stand at the centre of a circular garden divided into quadrants.

Control of the shrine was contested after the death of ʻAbdu'l-Bahá, Baháʼu'lláh's son, in 1921: Mírzá Muhammad ʻAlí and his supporters seized the keys in January 1922, and the British Mandate authorities returned them to Shoghi Effendi, ʻAbdu'l-Bahá's grandson, in February 1923. Shoghi Effendi went on to acquire the surrounding land and lay out the gardens, and the Universal House of Justice carried out further development and landscaping after his death in 1957. The shrine, the Mansion of Bahjí and the surrounding gardens were inscribed on the UNESCO World Heritage List in July 2008 as part of the Baháʼí Holy Places in Haifa and the Western Galilee. A municipal reclassification of the property for tax purposes led the Baháʼí World Centre to close the gardens to the general public from April 2023. They reopened on 19 October 2025 after the dispute was settled.

The site is administered as part of the Baháʼí World Centre and is open free of charge to visitors of all faiths. Before the 2023 closure it drew about 200,000 visitors a year. Formal Baháʼí pilgrimage is separate from general access and open by registration to Baháʼís only.

== Architecture and features ==
=== The building ===
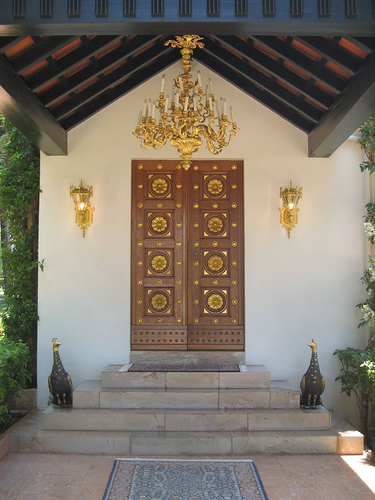
Main entrance to the shrine

The Shrine of Baháʼu'lláh occupies a stone house that formed part of the cluster of smaller buildings lying immediately to the west of, and adjacent to, the Mansion of Bahjí. The exterior of the shrine carries no major adornment beyond its entrance gate.

The Mansion of Bahjí, built in Ottoman Levantine style, was renovated by Shoghi Effendi after 1929 and legally designated a museum in Baháʼí ownership. Shoghi Effendi, who laid out the surrounding precincts from the 1930s onward, intended that the house should eventually stand within a mausoleum of 95 marble columns 6 m (20 ft) high; the design was still unbuilt at his death in 1957.

=== Interior ===
The interior of the shrine is organised around a central area that functions as an open garden roofed with glass. The glass roof was constructed by Ghulám-ʻAlíy-i-Najjár after the death of Baháʼu'lláh. Paths through the central garden are covered with Persian rugs, and side chambers for prayer and meditation open off it.

Baháʼu'lláh's remains lie in a room at the north-western corner of the building, which Baháʼí sources call the "Holy of Holies". Carpeted paths lead to a room from which the burial chamber can be seen; the chamber itself is not entered.

The Inner Court, the portico giving on to the burial chamber, is furnished with a gilded chandelier, a marble floor and oak doors bearing gold-leafed rosettes.

=== Gardens ===
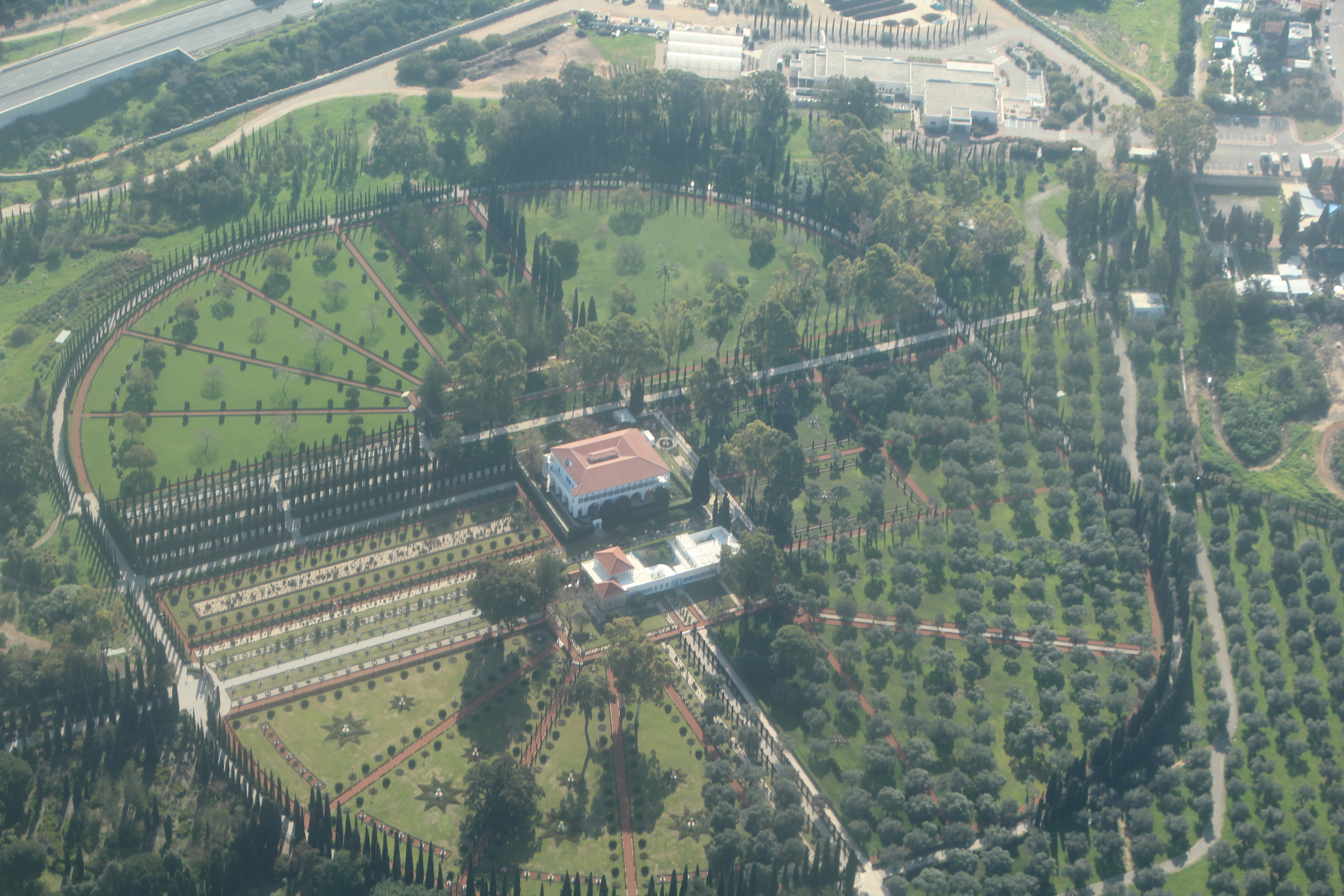
Aerial view of the shrine and the Haram-i-Aqdas (bottom left quadrant), 2022

The shrine and the Mansion of Bahjí stand at the centre of a circular garden. The garden is divided into quadrants arranged as rays from the shrine. It is planted mainly with olive groves and flowerbeds, and has pebble paths and no seating.

The north-western quadrant, about 13,000 m^{2} (140,000 sq ft) immediately around the shrine, is known as the Haram-i-Aqdas. Shoghi Effendi laid it out from October 1952 and named it in a cable of 9 February 1953 that described the landscaping as "virtually concluded" and the ground as the shrine's outer sanctuary. The Universal House of Justice completed the other three quadrants after his death in 1957. It is furnished with ornaments, lights and flower arrangements. A path runs around the shrine building within it, and white-pebble walkways lead through the planting.

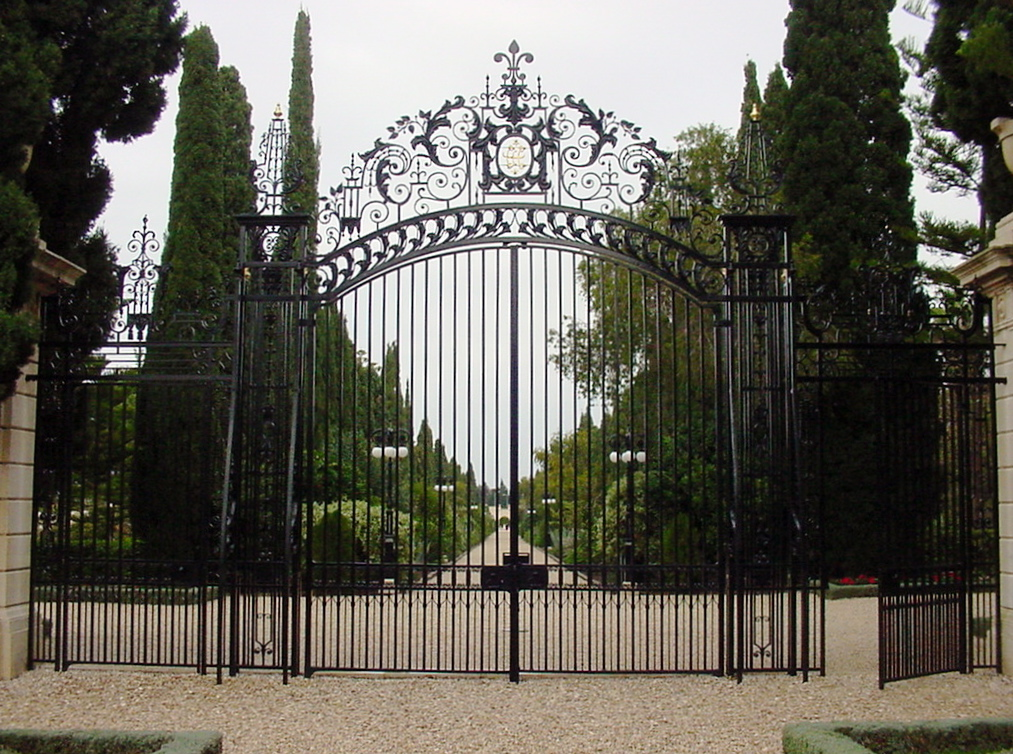
Collins Gate, at the entrance to the path leading to the shrine

Collins Gate, a wrought-iron gate on the way to the shrine, was obtained by Shoghi Effendi in England and given by Amelia Collins, a Hand of the Cause and Vice-President of the International Baháʼí Council. It was erected in 1952 once the buildings obstructing a formal approach to the shrine had been removed.

In 2001, expansion of the entrance area added courtyards, a visitors' centre and a monumental gate.

== Religious significance ==
Baháʼís regard the Shrine of Baháʼu'lláh as the holiest site of their religion. Shoghi Effendi placed it first among Baháʼí holy places, ahead of the Shrine of the Báb and of the two Houses that Baháʼí law makes the objects of pilgrimage.

=== Direction of prayer ===
The shrine is the Qiblih, or the point that Baháʼís face when reciting their daily obligatory prayer. The direction of prayer became a fixed place only with Baháʼu'lláh's burial: the Báb had designated as Qiblih "He whom God shall make manifest", a person rather than a location, and during Baháʼu'lláh's lifetime Baháʼís faced him wherever he was living. The Kitáb-i-Aqdas provided for the transition, directing worshippers to turn after his passing towards "the Spot that We have ordained for you".

=== Pilgrimage ===
After Baháʼu'lláh's death, ʻAbdu'l-Bahá designated the shrine as a place of pilgrimage and called visiting it obligatory for those able to do so. The visit is a visitation (Persian: زیارت, romanized: ziyárat), distinct from the pilgrimage (Arabic: حج, romanized: ḥajj) that the Kitáb-i-Aqdas makes obligatory, which Baháʼu'lláh designated to two other places: the House of Baháʼu'lláh in Baghdad and the House of the Báb in Shiraz. The pilgrimage programme run by the Baháʼí World Centre coordinates the visit to the two shrines for Baháʼí pilgrims.

=== Prayer at the shrine ===
Baháʼís visiting the shrine recite a set prayer and often prostrate themselves at the entrance. The prayer recited is the Tablet of Visitation (Persian: لوح زیارت, romanized: Lawḥ-i-Ziyárat), compiled from three of Baháʼu'lláh's tablets by the historian Nabíl-i-Aʻzam at ʻAbdu'l-Bahá's request. The practice is inherited from Islam, where a set text is recited at the tombs of saints and is particularly important in Shíʻism. The same text is used at the Shrine of the Báb, and Baháʼís recite it away from the shrine on holy days associated with Baháʼu'lláh and the Báb, particularly the anniversaries of their deaths.

== History ==
=== Background and early occupation ===
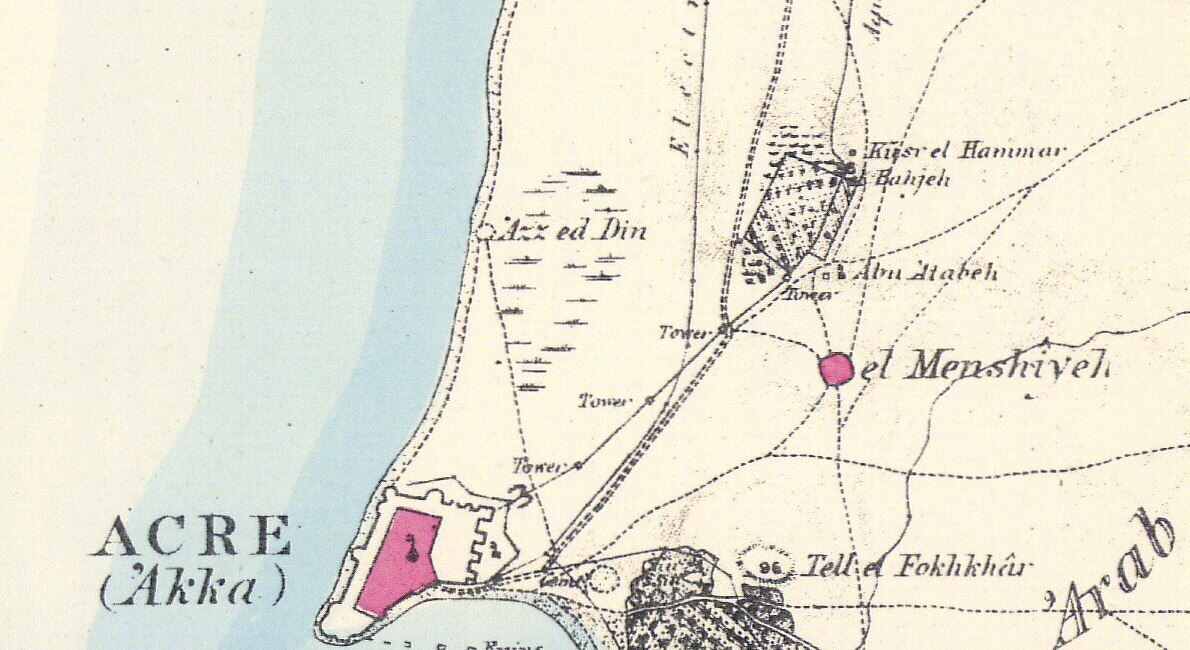
1880 PEF Survey of Palestine map, showing Bahjí just north of the village of Al-Manshiyya

Bahjí ("delight" in Arabic) began as a garden planted by Sulayman Pasha, the ruler of Acre, for his daughter Fatimih. ʻAbdu'lláh Pasha, whose father ʻAlí Pasha had owned the area, developed it further and built a mansion there. In 1831, Ibrahim Pasha used that mansion as his headquarters during his siege of Acre. The property had gardens and a pond fed by an aqueduct, and later passed to a Christian family, the Jamals.

ʻUdi Khammar, a notable member of Acre and a Maronite Christian, owned the house in the city where Baháʼu'lláh resided for several years, part of the present House of ʻAbbúd. He bought land from the Jamals near ʻAbdu'lláh Pasha's mansion and built the Mansion of Bahjí on the foundations of an earlier building on the site, completing it in 1870. He set an Arabic inscription over the door: "Greetings and salutations rest upon this mansion which increaseth in splendour through the passage of time. Manifold wonders and marvels are found therein, and pens are baffled in attempting to describe them." An epidemic in 1879 drove out its residents and left the building empty. ʻUdi Khammar died that year and was buried by the wall of the Mansion.

=== Mansion of Bahjí ===
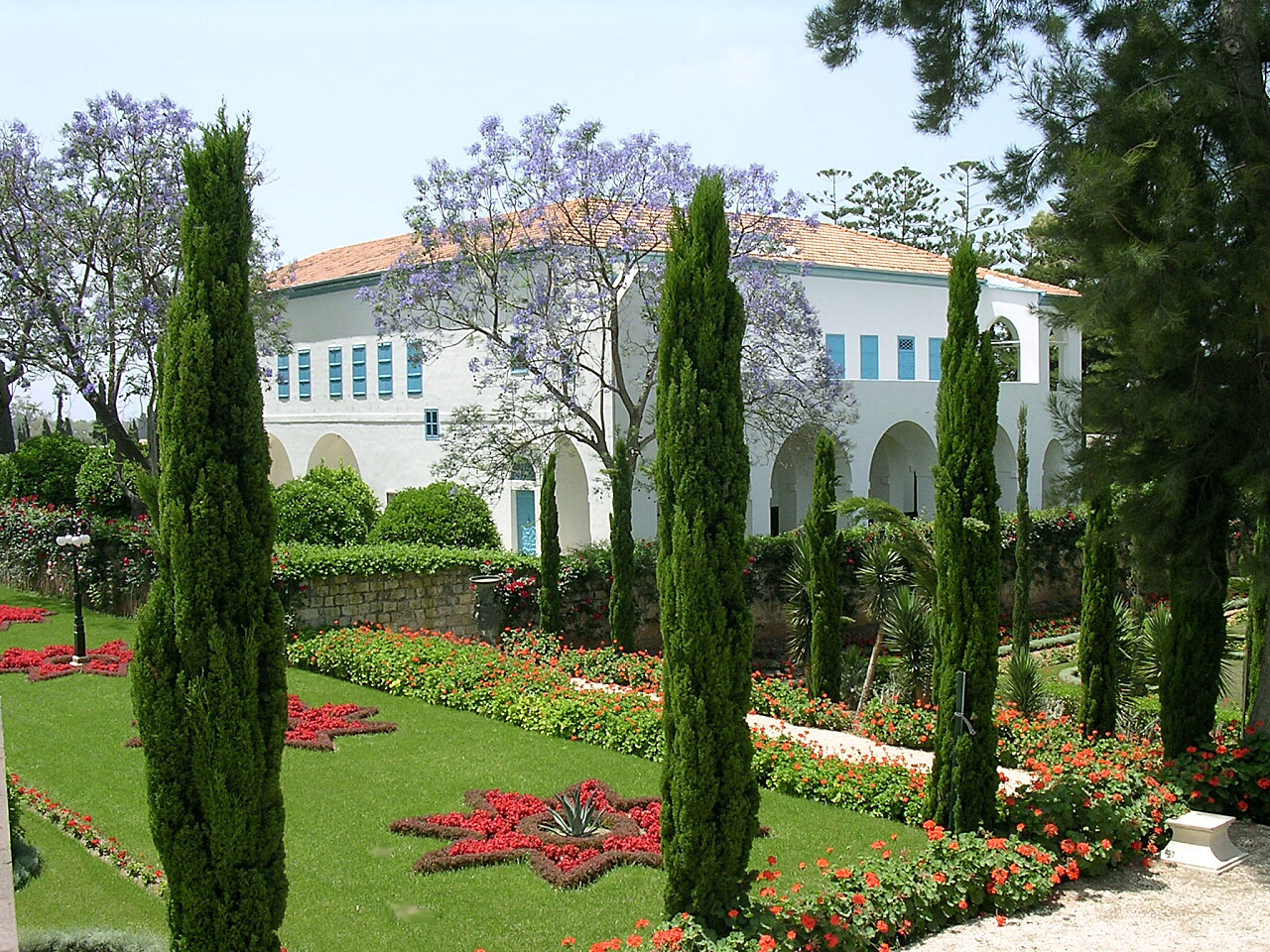
Mansion of Bahjí

Baháʼu'lláh's son ʻAbdu'l-Bahá rented and then bought the Mansion for his father. Baháʼu'lláh moved there from Mazra'ih in September 1879 and lived in the building until his death.

Baháʼu'lláh died in the Mansion before dawn on 29 May 1892. He was buried in an adjacent house belonging to his son-in-law Sayyid ʻAlí Afnán, husband of his daughter Furúghiyyih Khánum; it was the northernmost of three houses lying west of the Mansion. The interment took place shortly after sunset on the day of his death, in the northernmost room of that house.

ʻAbdu'l-Bahá had held a pilgrim house near the shrine since Baháʼu'lláh's death and used a nearby tea-house to welcome believers, among them the first pilgrims from the West in December 1898.

=== Custodianship dispute and recovery ===
Control of the Bahjí properties surrounding the shrine became contested after ʻAbdu'l-Bahá succeeded his father as leader of the Baháʼí Faith. Supporters of Mírzá Muhammad ʻAlí, a half-brother of ʻAbdu'l-Bahá, occupied much of the land immediately surrounding the shrine and the Mansion, which they later controlled for more than two decades. After ʻAbdu'l-Bahá's death in November 1921, his grandson, Shoghi Effendi, was appointed as his successor the following month.

Badíʻu'lláh, another half-brother of ʻAbdu'l-Bahá, seized the keys to the shrine and asserted that Mírzá Muhammad ʻAlí was its legal custodian. On 30 January 1922, the Governor of Acre took possession of the keys, placed guards at the shrine, and refused to surrender them to either side. In February 1923, the British Mandate authorities resolved the dispute in Shoghi Effendi's favor and returned the keys to him.

Muhammad ʻAlí and his supporters vacated the Mansion on 27 November 1929, after which Shoghi Effendi led its restoration, repairing the roof, woodwork, frescoes and stencilled decoration, and furnishing the rooms with Persian rugs sent by Baháʼís in Iran, illuminations by the calligrapher Mishkín-Qalam, and historical photographs and documents. Before opening the Mansion to the public, Shoghi Effendi invited the British High Commissioner for Palestine, General Sir Arthur Wauchope, to tour it and pressed the case for preserving it as a place of pilgrimage and a historical museum. By April 1932, it had opened to non-Baháʼí visitors as well as pilgrims and was legally designated as a museum under Baháʼí ownership. In the same year, Shoghi Effendi wrote to the District Commissioner for Haifa, Edward Keith-Roach, describing the Mansion as forming "an integral part of the Shrine of Baháʼu'lláh".

=== Israeli state recognition and development of the precincts ===
In 1935, the British Mandate authorities granted Baháʼí properties exemption from taxation on the condition that they were held for religious purposes, a status later recognized by the Israeli government on the basis established before 1948. During the 1948 Arab–Israeli War, the newly established Israeli authorities placed a notice on the Shrine of Baháʼu'lláh designating it a Lieu Sainte ("Holy Place"). In 1950, Shoghi Effendi appealed to the prime minister of Israel, David Ben-Gurion, for recognition of the rights of the Baháʼís and of the significance of the site and shrine. On 16 December 1950, Shoghi Effendi announced that the Israeli government had approved the lease of the grounds. The transaction was finalized in 1952 and covered more than 145,000 square metres (36 acres) of land surrounding the shrine and the Mansion.

Shoghi Effendi intended to supervise the development of the land himself but died in November 1957. On 2 December 1957, Leroy Ioas, an appointed member of the Hands of the Cause, secured the deeds to the shrine, Mansion, and other properties in the vicinity in the name of the Baháʼí International Council, the forerunner of the Universal House of Justice. Following its establishment in 1963, the Universal House of Justice continued the development of the land and gardens surrounding the Mansion and shrine, announcing their completion on 4 December 1973.

=== World Heritage Site ===
The Shrine of Baháʼu'lláh and the surrounding gardens at Bahjí were inscribed on the UNESCO World Heritage List in July 2008 as part of the serial property Baháʼí Holy Places in Haifa and the Western Galilee.

Day-to-day stewardship, including conservation, restoration and visitor management, is the responsibility of the Baháʼí World Centre. Israel, as State Party to the World Heritage Convention, carries the reporting obligation and submits periodic State of Conservation reports to the World Heritage Committee. Bahjí lies about three kilometres north of the Old City of Acre, itself inscribed on the World Heritage List in 2001.

=== Tax dispute and closure (2018–2025) ===
In late 2018, the Municipality of Acre revoked the property-tax exemption for about 80 per cent of the Bahjí complex, reclassifying it from a place of worship to a tourism site and issuing an annual demand of some NIS 7 million (about US$1.9 million). The Baháʼí World Centre contested the reclassification, arguing that the whole garden is a house of prayer in which meditative walking is a form of worship, a position supported by the expert witness Professor Moshe Sharon of the Hebrew University of Jerusalem. At an appeals committee hearing, the municipality's representative accepted that the new boundary between sacred and ordinary space had been drawn without consulting the Baháʼí community or any expert in Baháʼí practice. After the internal appeal was dismissed, the World Centre appealed to the Administrative Court and, in April 2023, closed the gardens to the general public, admitting Baháʼí pilgrims only.

The dispute was settled by agreement after intervention from the Israeli Prime Minister's Office and the Ministry of Finance, and the gardens reopened to the public on 19 October 2025. The Baháʼí World Centre reported the site's characterization as primarily a tourist attraction had been corrected.

== Visiting ==
The shrine and the surrounding gardens are open to people of all faiths and backgrounds without charge. Before the 2023 closure the gardens drew about 200,000 visitors a year. Writing in 2006, Margit Warburg recorded that the shrine was open to the public in the mornings and reserved for Baháʼís in the afternoons.

General access is separate from Baháʼí pilgrimage, a nine-day programme run by the Baháʼí World Centre and open by registration to Baháʼís only. Non-Baháʼí visitors are welcome at the site but do not undertake the formal pilgrimage.

Visitors are asked to dress modestly, with clothing covering the shoulders and reaching the knees, to remove their shoes before entering the shrine building, and to keep silence inside it. Photography is allowed throughout the gardens and outside the buildings but not inside them. The gardens close on Baháʼí holy days and on Yom Kippur, and may close in bad weather.

The site provides accessibility arrangements for visitors with disabilities, including paved or flagstone routes suitable for wheelchairs, tactile access to garden ornaments, guides trained to support lip-reading, and accessible restrooms. For pilgrims, the Universal House of Justice's Office of Pilgrimage has stated that wheelchair users are accommodated where possible, including entry to the shrines themselves, but that narrow and steep stairs put the upper floors of certain holy places out of reach: the Mansion of Bahjí, the House of ʻAbbúd and the House of ʻAbdu'lláh Pasha in Acre, and Baháʼu'lláh's room at the Mansion of Mazra'ih.

== See also ==
- Burial places of founders of world religions
- Baháʼí gardens
- Baháʼí pilgrimage
- Baháʼí World Centre
- Haram (site)
- Mansion of Bahjí
- Old City of Acre
- Shrine of the Báb
- Shrine of ʻAbdu'l-Bahá
