= Baháʼí World Centre =

Spiritual and administrative centre of the Baháʼí Faith, in and around Haifa, Israel

Coordinates: 32°48′52″N 34°59′13″E

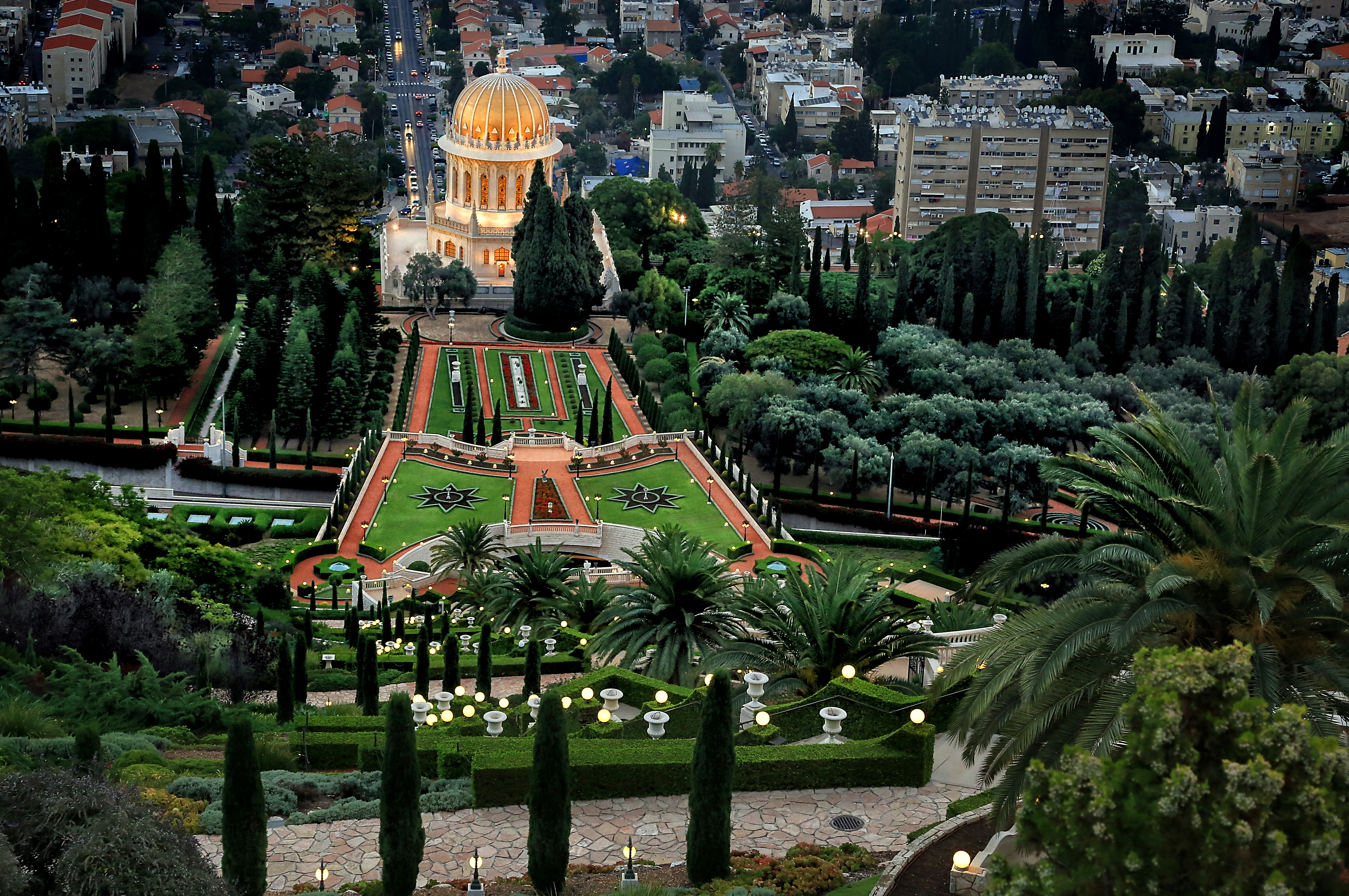
View towards the Shrine of the Báb from upper Terraces

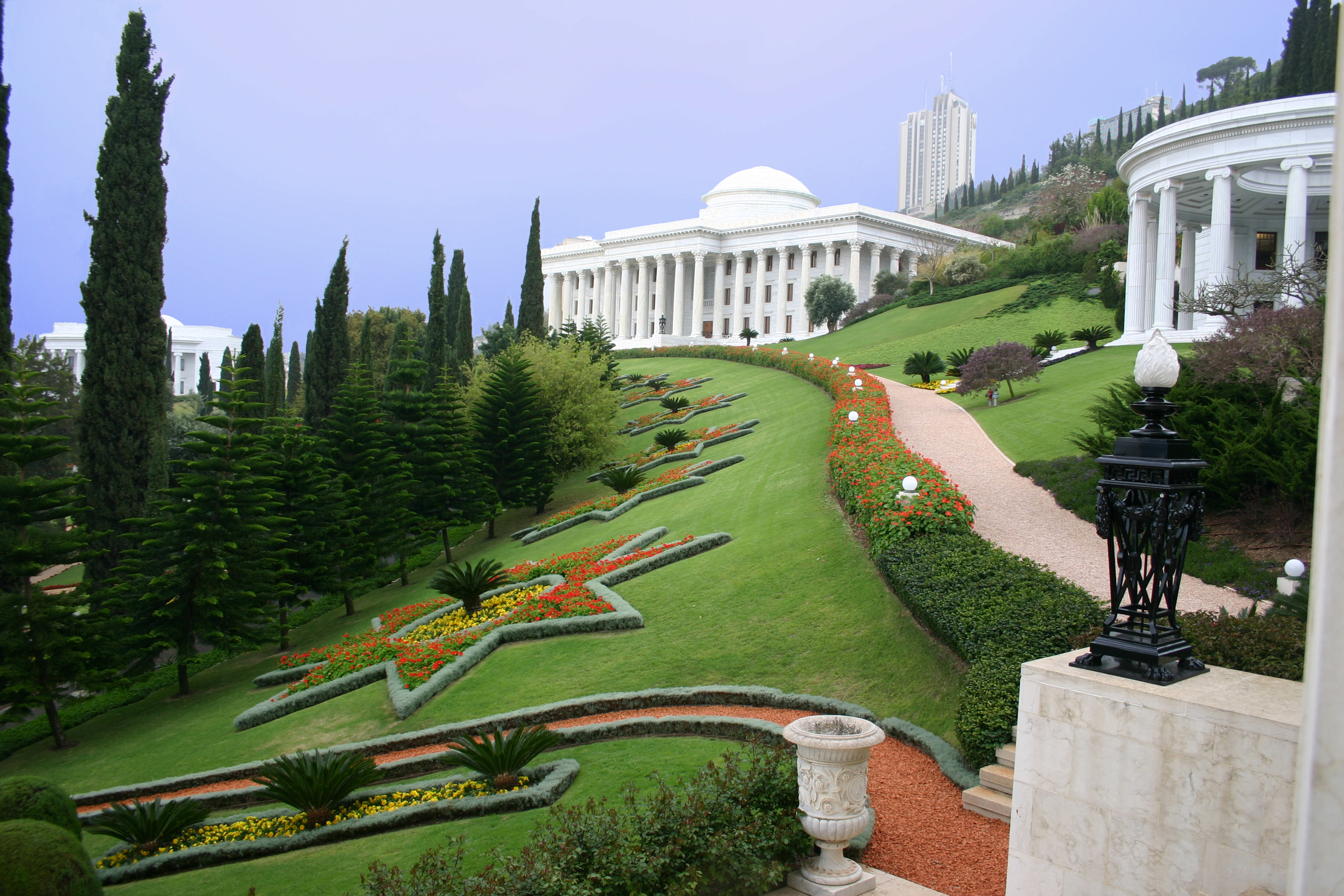
The Baháʼí Arc from the International Archives building

The Baháʼí World Centre is the name given to the spiritual and administrative centre of the Baháʼí Faith, representing sites in or near the cities of Acre and Haifa, Israel.

Much of the international governance and coordination of the Baháʼí Faith occurs at the Baháʼí World Centre, including global teaching plans and study and translation of the Baháʼí holy writings. The Universal House of Justice, representing the supreme governing body of the Baháʼí Faith, resides in Haifa. The Baháʼí World Centre is also a major destination for religious tourism, and the current destination for Baháʼí pilgrimage, attracting annually about one million visitors.

The Baháʼí World Centre was established at this location due to Baháʼu'lláh's imprisonment in Acre in 1868.

The Baháʼí terraces and the Shrine of the Báb on the northern slope of Mount Carmel were added to the World Heritage List in July 2008.

== History ==
The location of the administrative centre was a result of a successive number of banishments and imprisonments of Baháʼu'lláh, founder of the Baháʼí Faith. Baháʼu'lláh was banished from Persia by Nasser al-Din Shah in 1853, at which time Baháʼu'lláh went to Baghdad in the Ottoman Empire. Later he was exiled by the Sultan of the Ottoman Empire, at the behest of the Persian Shah, to territories further away from Iran and finally to Acre in Ottoman Syria in 1868. Baháʼu'lláh lived out the rest of his life in the area and he communicated with his followers throughout the Middle East, Central Asia and India through special couriers, and Acre became the centre of the expanding network of Baháʼí groups. When Baháʼu'lláh's imprisonment was eased, the area also became a centre of Baháʼí pilgrimage as Baháʼís would travel the long distance to see Baháʼu'lláh.

The location of the Shrine of the Báb on Mount Carmel was indicated by Baháʼu'lláh to his son ʻAbdu'l-Bahá during a visit to Haifa. Furthermore, the establishing of the administrative centre of the Baháʼí Faith on Mount Carmel was also indicated by Baháʼu'lláh in his Tablet of Carmel, which is considered one of the charter documents of the Baháʼí administration.

Baháʼu'lláh died in 1892 near Acre, and his resting place is in Bahji. Following his death, Baháʼu'lláh's son ʻAbdu'l-Bahá was appointed to be the head of his father's faith and the condition of the area as the centre of Baháʼí activity continued. He continued to correspond with Baháʼís all over the world, including now Baháʼís in the West. While he was still officially a prisoner and confined to Acre, ʻAbdu'l-Bahá also organized the transfer of the remains of the Báb from Iran to Palestine. He organized the purchase of land on Mount Carmel that Baháʼu'lláh had instructed should be used to lay the remains of the Báb, and organized for the construction of the Shrine of the Báb. This process took another 10 years and was completed in 1909.

In 1908, the Young Turks revolution freed all political prisoners in the Ottoman Empire, and ʻAbdu'l-Bahá was freed from imprisonment. Soon after the revolution, he moved to live in Haifa near the Shrine of the Báb, and since then the administrative headquarters of the religion have been in Haifa. During the final years of ʻAbdu'l-Bahá's life the increasing levels of correspondence led to the employment of a number of secretaries including some in Western languages and the provision of a Pilgrim House in the area. ʻAbdu'l-Bahá died in 1921, and was buried in a room of the Shrine of the Báb in Haifa.

After ʻAbdu'l-Bahá's death, Shoghi Effendi was the head of the religion, and he directed the development of a number of separate projects in the area. He renovated the house of Baháʼu'lláh in Bahji in 1929, and in the 1950s secured legal possession of the lands around the building, creating a number of gardens. He also obtained possession of other sites around Acre related to Baháʼu'lláh's life, including the House of ʻAbbud. Around Haifa, he expanded the Shrine of the Báb by developing its golden-domed superstructure, and purchased lands surrounding the Shrine in order to create gardens. Shoghi Effendi had also decided that the buildings housing the institutions of the religion indicated in Baháʼu'lláh's Tablet of Carmel, including the Universal House of Justice, the as yet unestablished governing body of the worldwide Baháʼí community, would be arranged in the shape of an arc surrounded by gardens. The fulcrum of this arc would be the Monument Gardens, which hold the graves of members of the Baháʼí holy family. During his own lifetime he started the construction of one of the buildings comprising the arc, the International Archives building. He also negotiated tax-exempt status for all Baha'i properties. The religion's situation in Israel was clarified in an agreement signed in 1987 by then Vice-Premier and Foreign Minister, Shimon Peres, in which the government formally acknowledged the Baháʼí Faith as a “recognized religious community in Israel,” declared its "friendly relations" with the Baháʼí world community, noted that the "holiest places of the Baháʼí Faith, … are located in Israel", and confirmed "that the Universal House of Justice is the Trustee of the Baháʼí International Community over the Holy Places of the Baháʼí Faith in Israel and over the Baháʼí endowments in Israel".

== Buildings ==
The other buildings of the Arc, the Seat of the Universal House of Justice, the Centre for the Study of the Sacred Texts, and the Seat of the International Teaching Centre, were completed in 1982, 1999 and 2000 respectively. The fifth and yet-to-be-built building, the International Baháʼí library, is planned to be eventually built at the eastern end of the Arc, and is anticipated as a center for "knowledge in all fields", including scientific investigation. The terraces around the Shrine of the Báb were also completed in 2001.

== Administration ==
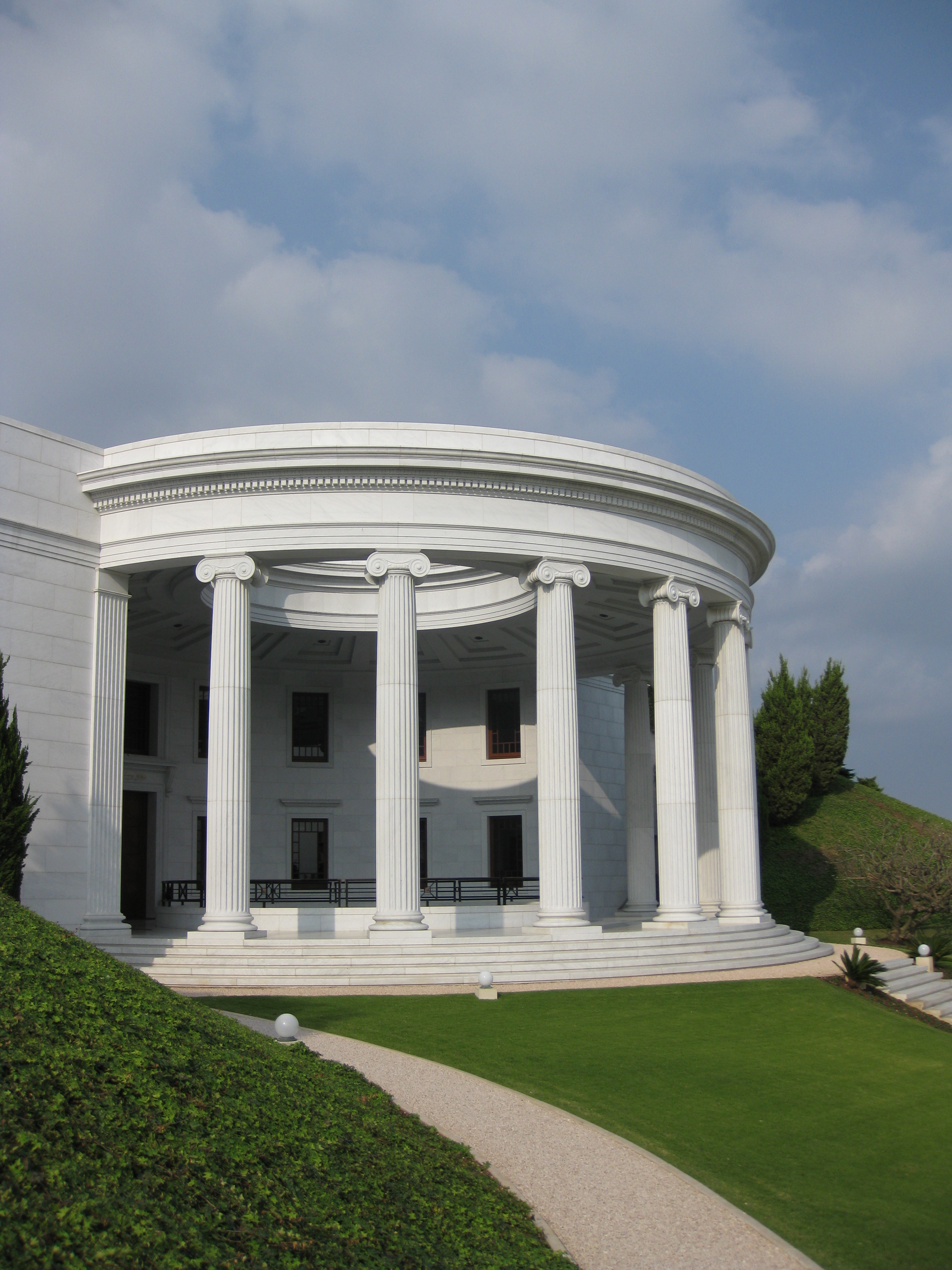
Centre for the Study of the Texts

Much of the international governance and coordination of the Baháʼí Faith occurs at the Baháʼí World Centre. These include decisions that affect the religion on a global level, and the study and translation of the Baháʼí holy writings. The Universal House of Justice, representing the supreme governing body of the Baháʼí Faith, resides in Haifa, along with the International Teaching Centre, which coordinates the activities between the Continental Counsellors and works as a liaison between them and the House of Justice.

=== Staff ===
During Shoghi Effendi's time as the head of the Baháʼí Faith, the British Mandate of Palestine was dealing with a growing conflict between Zionists and Arabs in the region of Palestine. With the end of the mandate in 1948, and the resulting 1948 Arab–Israeli War, the majority of the Baháʼís in Israel left the country, and only Shoghi Effendi and a few others remained behind. In 1963 the first Universal House of Justice was elected, with its seat in Haifa, and since then the number of support staff in Haifa has grown to several hundred support staff from over sixty countries. The increase in staff was due to the international growth of the Baháʼí community and the increased range of work which is done at the Baháʼí World Centre; the staff include the House of Justice's specialized departments such as the secretariat, research, finance, statistics and others which tend to the maintenance of the gardens and buildings. Additionally, select individuals are approinted to other Baháʼí bodies such as the International Teaching Centre and the Baháʼí International Development Organization and as such serve at the Baháʼí World Centre.

Uniquely, despite the presence of several hundred volunteer staff in Haifa and Acre, there is no formal community of Baháʼís in Israel in the sense that there are no Nineteen Day Feasts, Spiritual Assemblies etc. Additionally, since the days of Baháʼu'lláh, Baháʼís have observed a self-imposed ban on teaching their religion to the local population of Israel. Formal declarations of faith by Israelis are not accepted. In a letter dated 1995, the Baháʼí Universal House of Justice wrote:

...the people in Israel have access to factual information about the Faith, its history and general principles. Books concerning the Faith are available in libraries throughout Israel, and Israelis are welcome to visit the Shrines and the surrounding gardens. However, in keeping with a policy that has been strictly followed since the days of Baháʼu'lláh, Baháʼís do not teach the Faith in Israel. Likewise, the Faith is not taught to Israelis abroad if they intend to return to Israel. When Israelis ask about the Faith, their questions are answered, but this is done in a manner which provides factual information without stimulating further interest.

In 2002, the Finance Ministry of Israel threatened to invalidate a status agreement between the Baha'i World Center and the Israeli government. The Baha'is were told to hire more Israelis at their centers in the Haifa region.

The local Israelis and the staff of the Baháʼí World Centre have little contact with each other. Even the staff members who have lived in Israel for many years usually do not speak Hebrew or Arabic. Mothers with small children who are married to the staff members and Iranian Baháʼís with Jewish backgrounds are somehow connected to the Israeli society.

== Perception by residents ==
Some faculty at the University of Haifa conducted interviews with 29 people from Haifa who were affected by the expansions at the Baháʼí World Centre beginning in the late 1980s and continuing throughout the 1990s. The construction included Gardens, terraces, the Center for the Study of texts, the International Teaching Center, and the expansion of the Archives. This culminated in an opening in 2001.

The interviewees perceived the site as "a symbol of the city", "excellently managed and maintained", and post-construction, residents recognized the advantages of "financial contribution to the neighborhood community center and to Arab students in the city, increased property values, and improved environmental quality." However, they also felt "alienated and increasingly distanced from the site" due to fencing and access control, and inequality when they compared the site's "esthetically impressive, well-cultivated appearance to their own neighboring neighborhoods."

The city of Haifa and others supported the site's establishment and promoted the projects for their inter-religious tolerance, esthetics, economic growth, tourism, and boosting the international status of the city of Haifa. The interviews suggested that the expansion created conflicts with some locals who perceived the construction as "misleading and/or overly aggressive and exerting undue power and political influence over decision-makers... Disputes emerged not around values but primarily around questions of physical planning and local nuisances." The interviewees who felt that they were treated unfairly wanted any-time unfettered access to the Baháʼí properties after opening, but the properties had controlled access with open hours and guided tours. Some regarded Haifa as “a city that became sacred as a result of the slightly strange and mysterious Baha'i religion".

== See also ==
- Baháʼí gardens
- Religion in Israel (section Baháʼí)
