= House of Bahá'u'lláh in Baghdad =

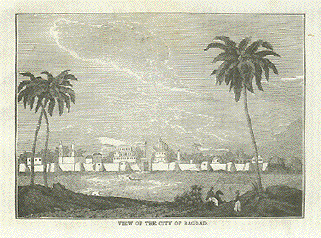
A view of Baghdad in 1855

The House of Baháʼu'lláh in Baghdad, also known as the "Most Great House" (Bayt-i-Aʻzam) and the "House of God," is where Baháʼu'lláh lived from 1853 to 1863 (except for two years when he left to the mountains of Kurdistan, northeast of Baghdad, near the city of Sulaymaniyah).

== Description ==
It was located in the Kadhimiya district of Baghdad, near the western bank of the Tigris river. It is designated in the Kitáb-i-Aqdas as a place of pilgrimage and is considered a holy place by Baháʼís.

In 1922 the house was confiscated by Shia authorities, who were hostile to the Baháʼí Faith. The Council of the League of Nations upheld the Baháʼí's claim to the house, but it has not yet been returned to the Baháʼí community.

The house was destroyed in June 2013, under circumstances that are currently unclear. The Universal House of Justice sent a letter to all the National Spiritual Assemblies on 27 June informing them of the house's destruction.
