= Qiblih =

Location to which Baháʼís face when saying their daily obligatory prayers

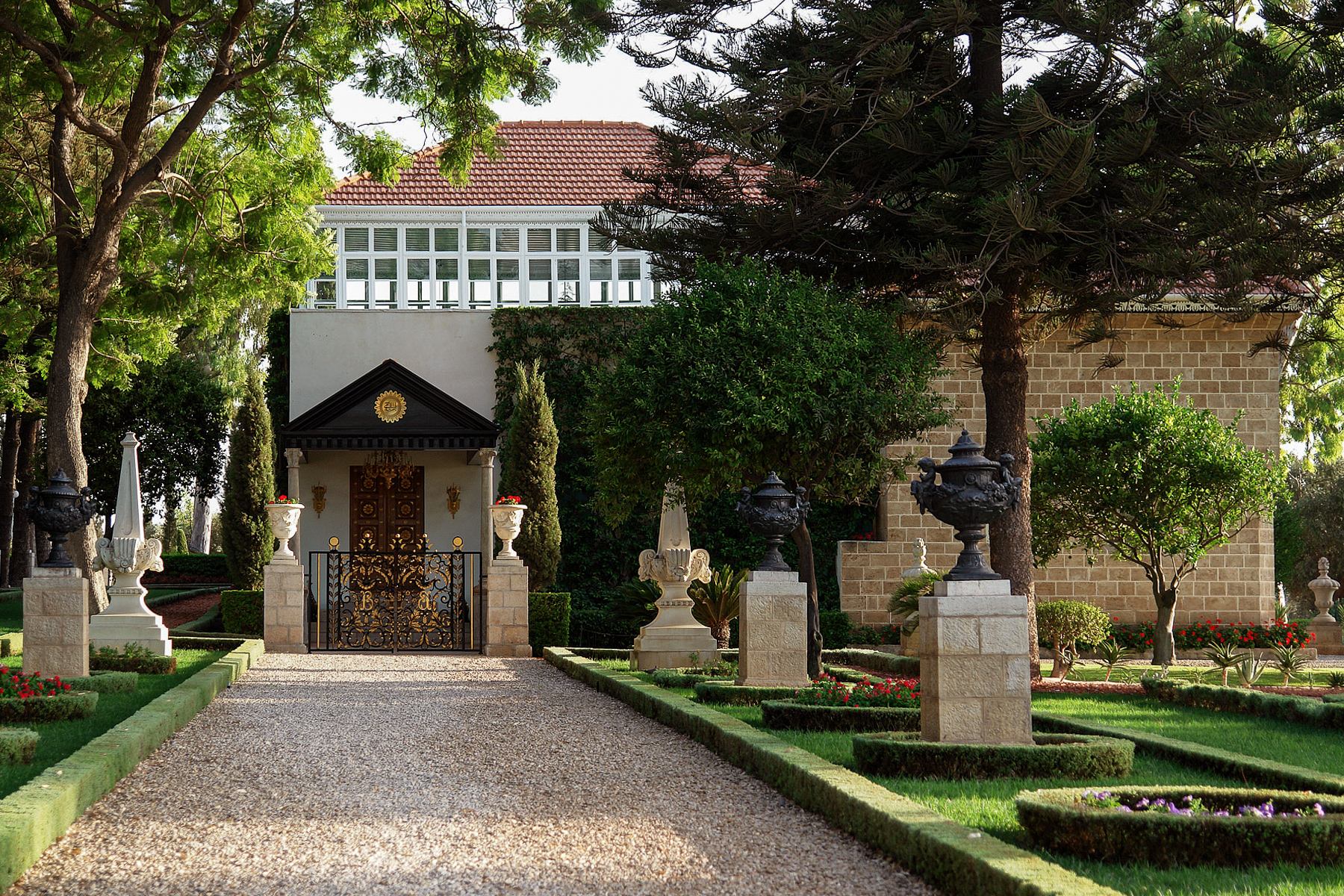
The Shrine of Baháʼu'lláh near Acre, Israel, the Qiblih and holiest site on Earth for Baháʼís

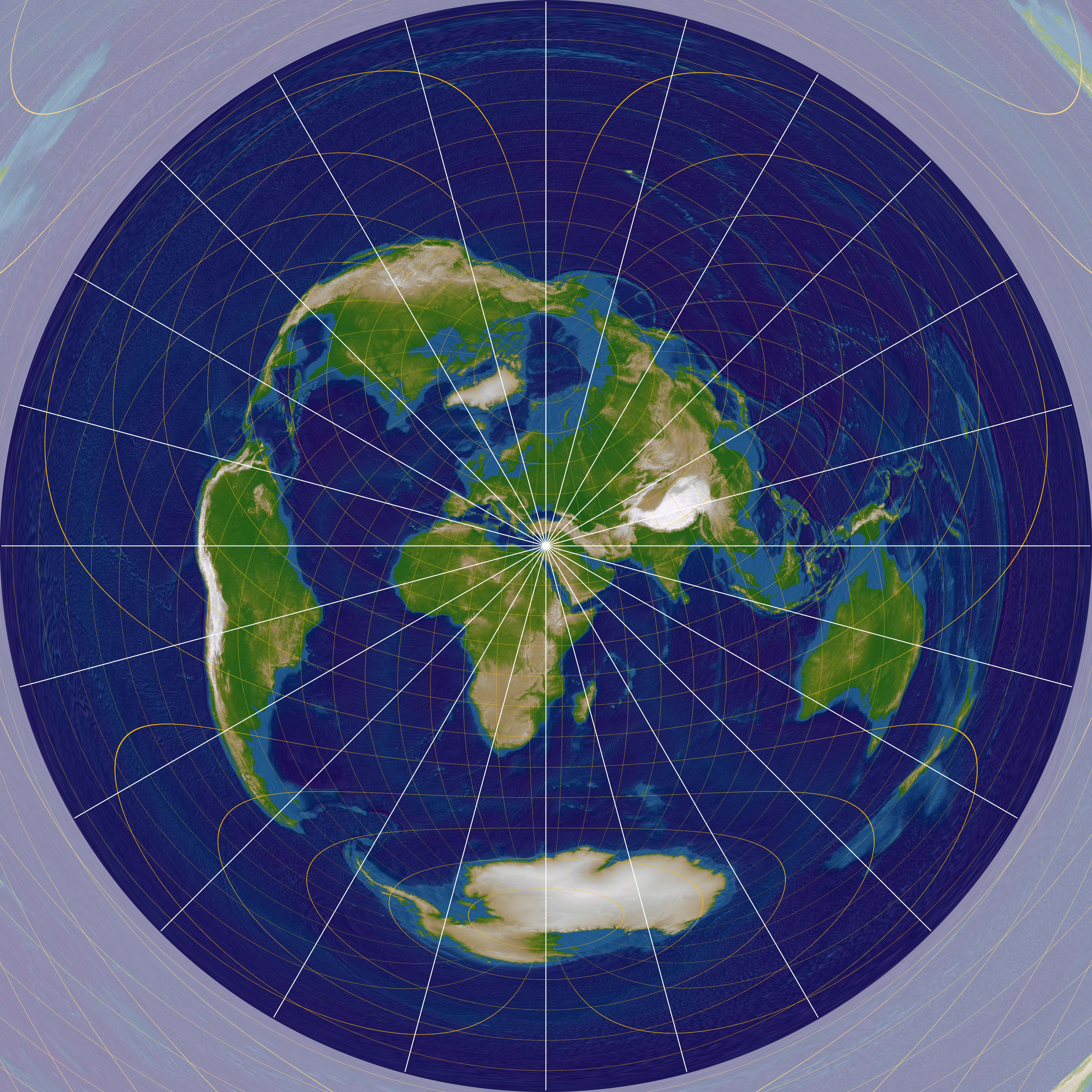
The shortest direction to the Shrine of Baháʼu'lláh from all over the world (Azimuthal equidistant projection, showing the great circles)

In the Baháʼí Faith, the Qiblih (Arabic: قبلة, "direction") is the location to which Baháʼís face when saying their daily obligatory prayers. The Qiblih is fixed at the Shrine of Baháʼu'lláh, near Acre, in present-day Israel; approximately at 32°56′37″N 35°5′31″E.

In Bábism the Qiblih was originally identified by the Báb with "the One Whom God will make manifest", a messianic figure predicted by the Báb. Baháʼu'lláh, the founder of the Baháʼí Faith claimed to be the figure predicted by the Báb. In the Kitáb-i-Aqdas, Baháʼu'lláh confirms the Báb's ordinance and further ordains his final resting-place as the Qiblih for his followers. ʻAbdu'l-Bahá describes that spot as the "luminous Shrine", "the place around which circumambulate the Concourse on High." The concept exists in other religions. Jews face Jerusalem, more specifically the site of the former Temple of Jerusalem. Muslims face the Kaaba in Mecca, which they also call the Qibla (another transliteration of Qiblih).

Baháʼís do not worship the Shrine of Baháʼu'lláh or its contents, the Qiblih is simply a focal point for the obligatory prayers. When praying obligatory prayers the members of the Baháʼí Faith face in the direction of the Qiblih. It is a fixed requirement for the recitation of an obligatory prayer, but for other prayers and devotions one may follow what is written in the Qurʼan: "Whichever way ye turn, there is the face of God."

== Burial of the dead ==
"The dead should be buried with their face turned towards the Qiblih. This also is in accordance with what is practiced in Islam. There is also a congregational prayer to be recited. Besides this there is no other ceremony to be performed" (From a letter written on behalf of Shoghi Effendi to an individual believer, July 6, 1935).

== See also ==
- Direction of prayer
  - Mizrah, the direction of prayer in the Jewish faith, facing the Temple Mount in Jerusalem
  - Ad orientem, comparable concept in traditional Christianity; informs orientation of many church buildings
  - Qibla, the Muslim direction of prayer
- Orientation of churches
- Spatial deixis, spatial orientation relevant to an utterance
