= Hájí Amín =

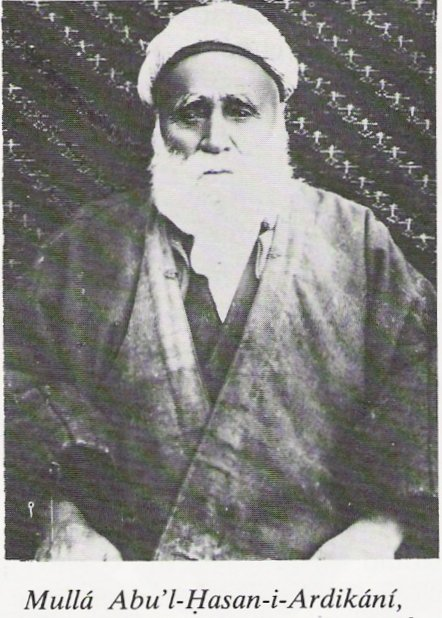

Mullá Abu'l-Hasan-i-Ardikání (Persian: ملا أبو الحسن أرديكاني, surnamed Amín-i-Iláhí; 1831 – 1928), better known as Hájí Amín, was an eminent follower of Baháʼu'lláh, founder of the Baháʼí Faith. Amín served as the trustee of Huqúqu'lláh, was posthumously appointed a Hand of the Cause of God by Shoghi Effendi, and identified as one of the nineteen Apostles of Baháʼu'lláh.

== Background ==
At seventeen he married into a family of Bábís of the town of Ardikán, near Yazd, Iran. When news of the declaration of Baháʼu'lláh came, he accepted immediately and travelled throughout the Persian Empire teaching the new message.

He was a literate man, and earned his living by trading and writing for the illiterate as he travelled. He was known to collect letters that people wished to forward to Baháʼu'lláh, and also distributed tablets of Baháʼu'lláh where people received them.

He made his way to 'Akká, and became the first Baháʼí from outside of the city to see Baháʼu'lláh, returning on several occasions. When Haji Shah-Muhammad Manshadi was killed in 1880, Amín became the trustee of the Huqúqu'lláh.

Hájí Amín lived a long life, and was Trustee of the Huqúqu'lláh [“Right of God”—a certain Baháʼí fund] during the ministries of Baháʼu'lláh and ʻAbdu'l-Bahá and during part of the ministry of Shoghi Effendi. During his long and turbulent life he was a source of inspiration and loving guidance for all the believers. He often visited their homes and urged them to become detached from the things of the world and to follow the path of modesty in all aspects of life.

In 1891, he was imprisoned for three years in Tihran and Qazvin, and during the time of ʻAbdu'l-Bahá he continued his travels, visiting 'Akká and Haifa on many occasions. In old age he settled down in Tihran.
