= Valíyu'lláh Varqá =

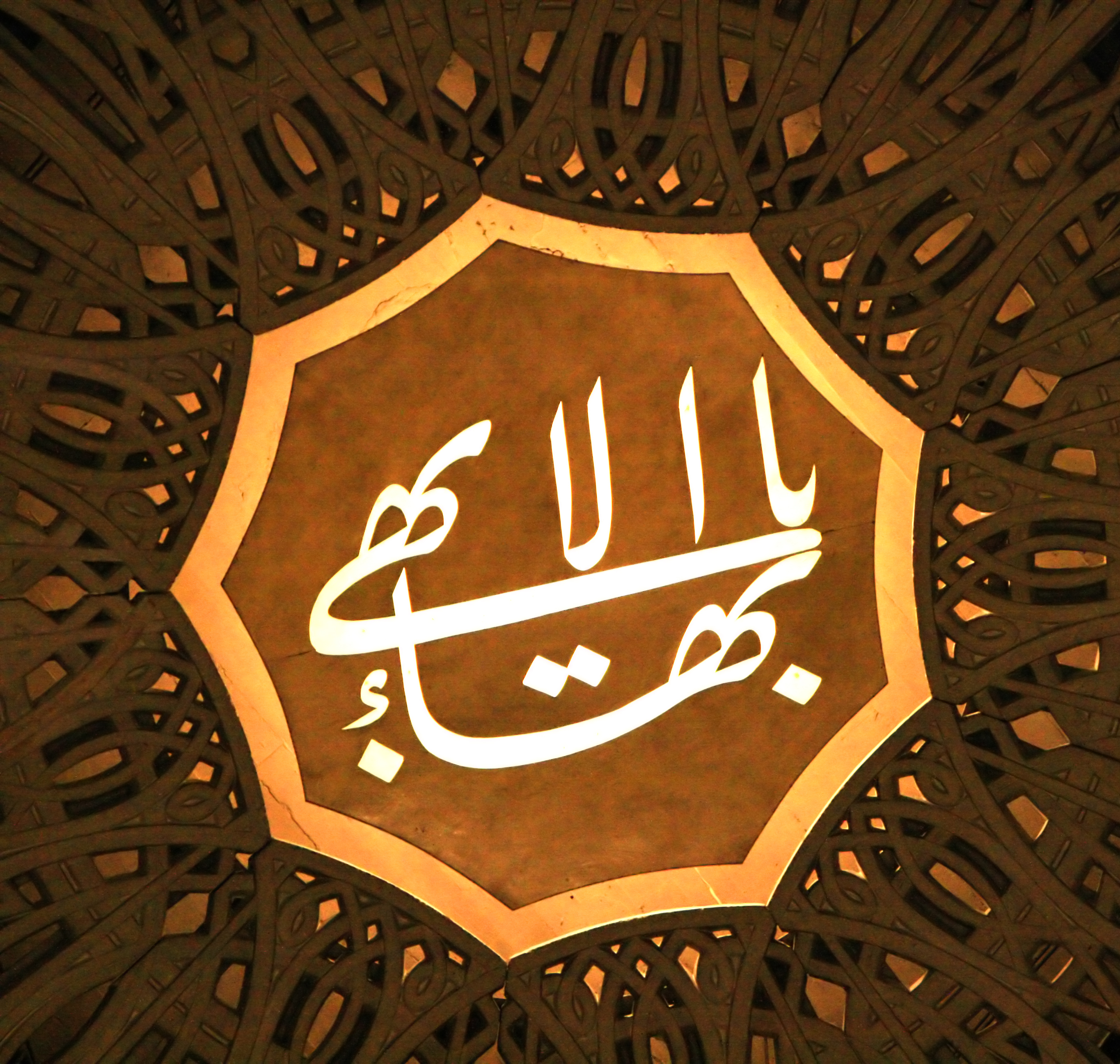
The Greatest Name, at the pinnacle of the interior of the dome of the Bahá'í Temple in Wilmette, Illinois.

Mírzá Valíyu'lláh Khán-i-Varqá (Persian: میرزا ولی‌الله‌خان ورقا ; 1884 – 1955) was a prominent Persian Baháʼí who was appointed a Hand of the Cause by Shoghi Effendi.

He was the son of Varqá, the martyr-poet, and the father of ʻAlí-Muhammad Varqá, (1911 – September 22, 2007).

Varqá joined ʻAbdu'l-Bahá's entourage while he traveled across America. He was appointed Trustee of the Huqúqu'lláh in 1940 and a Hand of the Cause in 1951.
