= Criticism of the Baháʼí Faith =

The Baháʼí Faith is a relatively new religion that teaches the essential worth of all religions and the unity of all people.

The criticisms the religion has faced vary considerably in different regions of the world. In the West, progressives have criticized the Baháʼí Faith for some of its conservative social practices, notably the prohibition on premarital or homosexual intimacy for Baháʼís. Western academics have criticized the requirement for Baháʼís to seek pre-publication review when publishing on the religion, as well as the exclusion of women from serving on the Universal House of Justice. These issues may be only marginal to the numerically dominant Baháʼí community outside of Europe and North America.

The religion's rise in the Middle East and subsequent movement into the West has given rise to a body of anti-Baháʼí polemic. Christian and Muslim authors (e.g., John Ankerberg) have criticized its history and founders, institutions, teachings, and use of prophecy. In Iran and other parts of the Middle East, Baháʼís continue to be criticized for breaking with Islam and accused of conspiring with Western powers, resulting in intense persecution and the loss of civil rights.

The Baháʼí Faith has maintained its unity and avoided serious division, although several attempts have been made to create sects. Every attempted Baháʼí schism has failed to attract more than a few hundred individuals and declined over time. The followers of such splinter groups are shunned and not considered Baháʼís by the majority.

== Teachings ==
=== Unity of religion ===
Clockwise: Christian cross, Islamic star and crescent, Baháʼí nine-pointed star, and Jewish Star of David

Christian author and missiologist Ed Stetzer rejects the Baháʼí Faith as a syncretic combination of faiths, while Christian author John Ankerberg points to discrepancies between faiths to contradict the idea of any unity of religion.

Christian apologist Francis J. Beckwith wrote of the Baháʼí teachings:

The fact that the various alleged manifestations of God represented God in contradictory ways implies either that manifestations of God can contradict one another or that God's own nature is contradictory. If manifestations are allowed to contradict one another, then there is no way to separate false manifestations from true ones or to discover if any of them really speak for the true and living God…. If, on the other hand, God's own nature is said to be contradictory, that is, that God is both one God and many gods, that God is both able and not able to have a son, personal and impersonal, etc., then the Bahaʼi concept of God is reduced to meaninglessness.

Baháʼí authors have written in response that the contradictory teachings are either social laws that change from age to age as part of a progressive revelation or human error introduced to the more ancient faiths over time.

=== Christianity ===
Regarding the Baháʼí teachings of peace and unity, Edward Granville Browne wrote that while he found them admirable, they are inferior to the simplicity and beauty of the teachings of Jesus. He further argued that in the case of "Baha'ism, with its rather vague doctrines as to the nature and destiny of the soul of man, it is a little difficult to see whence the driving force to enforce the ethical maxims can be derived."

William McElwee Miller (1892–1993) was a Presbyterian missionary in Iran who published a polemic entitled The Baha'i Faith (1974), in which he attacked the religion by promoting the views of individuals opposing Baháʼí leadership. For example, the perspectives of Subh-i-Azal, Mírzá Muhammad ʻAlí, and Mason Remey, the most prominent covenant-breakers of the religion, were all upheld by Miller in an attempt to show its adherents as deceived, its teachings superficial or irrelevant, and its administration "a dictatorship". Douglas Martin wrote that Miller's writings were driven by animus against what he saw as a successful rival faith that was moving into Christian lands.

=== Islam ===
Islamic theology regards Muhammad as the Khatam an-Nabiyyin, the last prophet whom God sent, and Islam as the final religion. Baháʼu'lláh's claim of divine revelation directly conflicts with this common interpretation of Islam. Thus, authorities in the Muslim world have rejected the Baháʼí Faith and regard Baháʼís as apostates if they had been Muslims before conversion.

Baháʼu'lláh's teachings on the equality of men and women, and that slavery should be banned, were controversial ideas in the nineteenth century Middle East that contributed to attempts to destroy his movement.

== Practices ==
=== Gender differentiation ===
While Baháʼí teachings assert that men and women are spiritually equal, some areas of differentiation remain. Author Lil Abdo says that the Baháʼí understanding of sexual equality is different from that of secular feminists. Abdo presented the following list of criticisms of the Baháʼí Faith from a feminist perspective at an annual gathering for Baháʼí studies in 1995:

the ineligibility of women to serve on the Universal House of Justice--this is of particular interest to supporters of women priests within the Christian tradition; the intestacy laws in the Kitab-i-Aqdas; the dowry laws with particular reference to the virginity refund clause; the exemption of menstruating women from obligatory prayers and the implication of menstrual taboo; the use of androcentric language and male pronouns in texts; the emphasis on traditional morality and family values...

The religion's governing institution is the elected Universal House of Justice, whose membership is male-only. The ineligibility of women has caused discontent among small but vocal groups of western Baháʼí intellectuals, and criticism from others. ʻAbdu'l-Bahá said that it would become clear in the future why the restriction was in place. In all other levels of administration (other than the UHJ), however, women have always been eligible to serve, often contrary to prevailing cultural or societal norms.

=== Stance on homosexuality ===
The exclusion of same-sex marriage among Baháʼís has garnered considerable criticism in the Western world, where the Baháʼí teachings on sexuality may appear to be unreasonable, dogmatic, and difficult to apply in Western society. Particularly in the United States, Baháʼís have attempted to reconcile the immutable conservative teachings on sexuality with the otherwise socially progressive teachings of the religion, but it continues to be a source of controversy. The Universal House of Justice stated in 1995, and has repeated since, that the teachings on sexuality are laid down in the faith's scripture and that, "the House of Justice has no authority to change this clear teaching on homosexual practice." Former Baháʼí William Garlington said the Baháʼí position in the United States "can at most be characterized as one of sympathetic disapproval" toward homosexuality.

=== Capital punishment ===
In the Kitáb-i-Aqdas, Baháʼu'lláh prescribed the death penalty or life imprisonment both for intentional arson and murder. Baháʼí scholar Udo Schaefer stated that the legitimization of the death penalty in cases of murder and arson is usually met with disapproval and suspicion in Europe.

=== Excommunication ===
The Baháʼí teachings emphasize the need for unity, and have an official line of succession of leadership to prevent schism. The religion has seen a few attempts at splintering, but they have remained extremely small and declined over time. The followers of such sects are labeled Covenant-breakers, shunned, and viewed as enemies of the faith. Jason Boyett wrote in 12 Major World Religions that, "The [Baháʼí] condemnation of covenant-breakers is immediate, absolute, and—in a religion promoting love and acceptance—profoundly disconcerting." Excommunication among Baháʼís is rare and reserved for those actively promoting schism; on average worldwide, one person per year from 2000-2020 was expelled in such a way. People who leave the religion, transgress community standards, or attack it externally are not considered Covenant-breakers.

== Other criticism ==
=== Political accusations ===
Baháʼís have been accused, particularly by successive Iranian governments, of being agents or spies of Russia, Britain, the Shah, the United States, and as agents of Zionism—each claim being linked to each regime's relevant enemy and justifying anti-Baháʼí actions. The last claim is partially rooted in the presence of the Baháʼí World Centre in northern Israel.

=== Former Baháʼís ===
From 1980 onward, several well-educated Baháʼís left the religion and subsequently criticized it. For example, Juan Cole converted to the Baháʼí Faith in 1972, but later resigned in 1996 after conflicts with members of the administration who perceived him as extreme. Cole went on to criticize the Baháʼí Faith in three articles written from 1998 to 2002, describing a prominent Baháʼí as "inquisitor" and "bigot", and describing Baháʼí institutions as socially isolating, dictatorial, and controlling, with financial irregularities and sexual deviance. Central to Cole's complaints is the Baháʼí review process, which requires Baháʼí authors to gain approval before publishing on the religion. Soon after his resignation, Cole created an email list and website called H-Bahai, which became a repository of both primary source material and critical analysis on the religion.

Denis MacEoin, a scholar who had previously been a Baháʼí, criticized what he saw as a threat to the impartiality of the academic field of Bábí and Baháʼí studies due to the dominance of practising Baháʼís in the field. He specifically criticized the work of individual Baháʼí scholars he saw as defending Baháʼí orthodoxy at the expense of historical rigour, including William S. Hatcher, Muhammad Afnan, Juan Cole (although Cole subsequently left the religion), Nader Saiedi, and Moojan Momen. By contrast, MacEoin generally praised the work in Baháʼí studies of Baháʼí historian Peter Smith and non-Baháʼí sociologist Margit Warburg.
