= ʻAlí-Muhammad Varqá =

Baha'i college professor

ʻAlí-Muhammad Varqá (Persian: علي محمد ورقا; 1911 – 22 September 2007) was a prominent adherent of the Baháʼí Faith. He was the longest surviving Hand of the Cause of God, an appointed position in the Baháʼí Faith whose main function is to propagate and protect the religion on the international level.

Varqá was born in 1911 in Tehran, Iran to a well-known Iranian Baháʼí family. His grandfather Mírzá ʻAlí-Muhammad Varqá, from whom he received his name, was an Apostle of Baháʼu'lláh, and his father, Valíyu'lláh Varqá, was also a Hand of the Cause.

Varqá moved to Paris and studied at the Sorbonne, where he obtained a doctorate in 1950. He then returned to Iran and taught at the universities of Tehran and Tabriz. During this time, he also served in various administrative capacities in the Baháʼí community of Iran.

After his father's death, Varqá was appointed as a Hand of the Cause by Shoghi Effendi on November 15, 1955. He served in that capacity for 52 years until his death in 2007, and was the last surviving Hand of the Cause. As part of his role, he travelled to many countries, and attended the first Baháʼí national conventions of many countries including Belgium and Central African Republic. He also served as the trustee of Huqúqu'lláh since 1955, a role which his father also held.

In 1979, he moved to Canada and later to Haifa, Israel where the Baháʼí World Centre is located. He died on 22 September 2007 in Haifa and was buried in the Baháʼí cemetery there.
