= Varqá =

Iranian poet and early Baháʼí (1855–1896)

Varqá (Arabic: ورقا), born Mírzá ʻAlí-Muḥammad (Persian: میرزا علی‌محمد; 1855 – 2 May 1896), was an Iranian poet, student of traditional Iranian medicine, and an early teacher of the Baháʼí Faith. Baháʼu'lláh gave him the title Varqá, meaning "dove" in Arabic, in recognition of his poetry. ʻAbdu'l-Bahá posthumously designated him a Hand of the Cause, and Shoghi Effendi later included him among the nineteen Apostles of Baháʼu'lláh. Varqá and his twelve-year-old son Rúhu'lláh were killed in Tehran on 2 May 1896, one day after the assassination of Naser al-Din Shah.

== Early life and family ==
Varqá was born in Yazd in 1855. He was the youngest of the three sons of Ḥájí Mullá Míhdí, also known as ʻAṭrí, an early follower and teacher of the Bábí Faith. He also had a sister, Bibi Túbá. Following attacks instigated by Shaykh Muḥammad-Ḥasan-i-Sabzivárí, a leading mujtahid in Yazd, and the flogging of his father, Varqá was exiled from Yazd to Tabriz at the age of twenty-two with his father and one of his brothers, Mírzá Ḥusayn.

In Tabriz, Varqá married Fáṭimih, the daughter of Mírzá ʻAbdu'lláh Khán-i-Núrí Mázandarání, an official in the service of Crown Prince Muẓaffari'd-Dín Mírzá. They had four sons: ʻAzízu'lláh, Rúhu'lláh, Valíyu'lláh and Badíʻu'lláh.

== Poetry and medicine ==
Varqá studied traditional Iranian medicine and became known as a Persian poet. Baháʼu'lláh gave him the title Varqá, which he subsequently used as a pen name and family name. His poetic corpus has been estimated at more than 6,000 verses, of which 3,052 had been classified and copied by the time of the account cited by Encyclopædia Iranica. His poetry included ghazals, masnavis, qasidas, tarkib-band and tarjiʻ-band compositions, and largely expressed his devotion to Baháʼu'lláh and ʻAbdu'l-Bahá.

== Religious activity and travels ==
Varqá made three journeys to the Baháʼí holy places. His first pilgrimage took place in 1879. He travelled with his father and brother, Mírzá Ḥusayn, but his father died at Mazraʻih during the journey. Varqá subsequently met Baháʼu'lláh there and then returned to Tabriz.

Around 1882, while travelling to Yazd to visit his sister, Varqá was arrested and imprisoned for approximately one year. He was later transferred in fetters to Isfahan, where Masʻúd Mírzá, the Ẓillu's-Sulṭán, ordered his release after becoming acquainted with his poetry.

Varqá undertook his second pilgrimage in 1891, accompanied by his two eldest sons, ʻAzízu'lláh and the seven-year-old Rúhu'lláh. After his return to Tabriz, conflict within his wife's family contributed to the breakdown of the marriage. Varqá moved to Zanjan with his two eldest sons and later married Liqáʼíyyih Khánum, the daughter of a Zanjan Baháʼí named Ḥájí Ímán.

His third and final journey to the Holy Land took place in 1893, after the death of Baháʼu'lláh. ʻAzízu'lláh and Rúhu'lláh again accompanied him, and the family met ʻAbdu'l-Bahá and Bahíyyih Khánum.

In 1896, while preparing to leave Zanjan for Tehran, Varqá, Rúhu'lláh and several other Baháʼís were arrested. Following interrogation, Varqá, his son and another Baháʼí were sent to Tehran on the order of ʻAláʼu'd-Dawlih, the governor of Zanjan.

== Arrest and death ==
In the spring of 1896, Varqá, Rúhu'lláh and two other Baháʼís were held under heavy chains in the government prison at Sabza Maydán in Tehran. They were accused of spreading the Baháʼí religion and were pressured to recant.

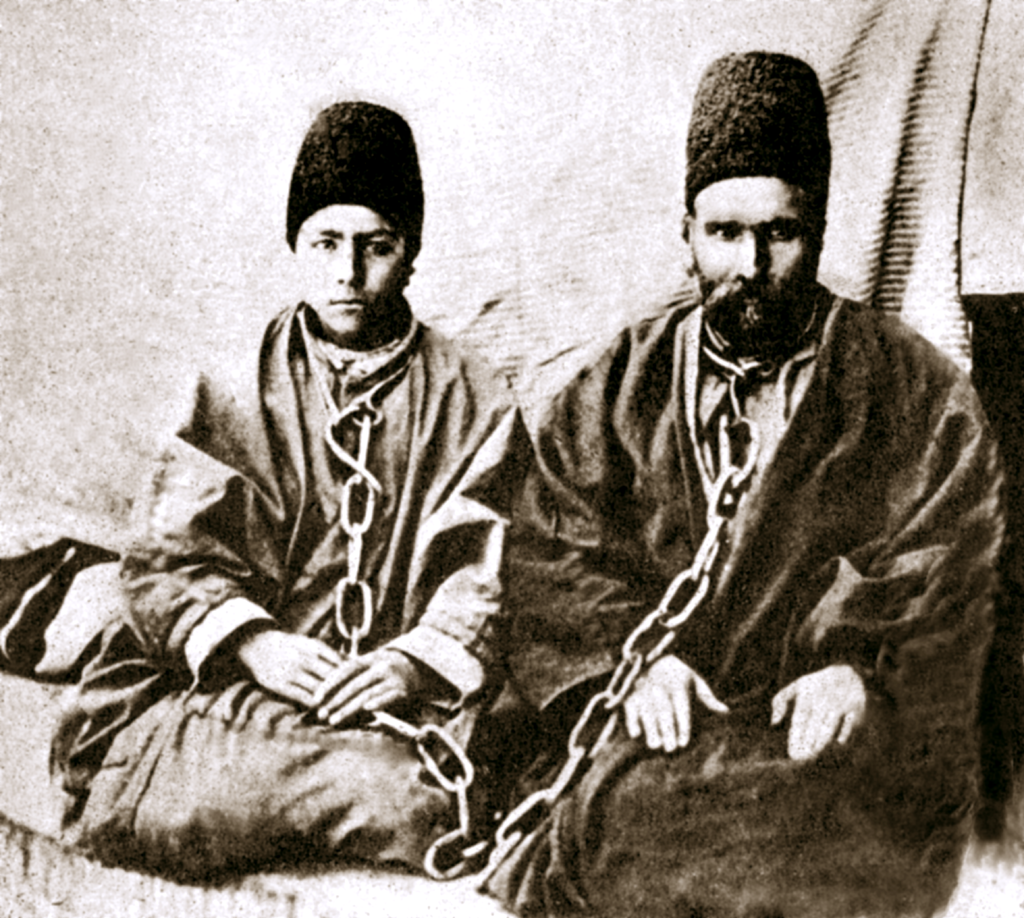
Varqá (right) and his son Rúhu'lláh

Naser al-Din Shah was assassinated on 1 May 1896 while visiting the Shah-Abdol-Azim shrine south of Tehran. The following day, the prison official Muʻín al-Sulṭán Ḥájib al-Dawlih accused Varqá of having instigated the assassination. He stabbed and killed Varqá in front of Rúhu'lláh and subsequently had the twelve-year-old boy strangled after he refused to recant. Their remains were buried in Tehran's old Baháʼí cemetery.

== Legacy ==
Varqá was posthumously designated a Hand of the Cause by ʻAbdu'l-Bahá and was later named by Shoghi Effendi as one of the nineteen Apostles of Baháʼu'lláh.

Varqá's third son, Valíyu'lláh Varqá, was appointed a Hand of the Cause by Shoghi Effendi on 24 December 1951. Following Valíyu'lláh's death in November 1955, Shoghi Effendi appointed his eldest son, ʻAlí-Muhammad Varqá, a Hand of the Cause and chief trustee of Ḥuqúqu'lláh.

== Sources ==
- Harper, Barron (1997). Lights of Fortitude: Glimpses into the Lives of the Hands of the Cause of God. Oxford: George Ronald. ISBN 0-85398-413-1.
- Momen, Moojan (2015). The Baháʼí Communities of Iran, 1851–1921. Vol. 1. Oxford: George Ronald. ISBN 978-0-85398-585-3.
