= Baháʼí laws =

Laws and ordinances used in the Bahá'í Faith

Baháʼí laws are laws and ordinances used in the Baháʼí Faith and are a fundamental part of Baháʼí practice. The laws are based on authenticated texts from Baháʼu'lláh, the founder of the Baháʼí Faith, and also includes subsequent interpretations from ʻAbdu'l-Bahá and Shoghi Effendi, and legislation by the Universal House of Justice. Baháʼí law is presented as a set of general principles and guidelines and individuals must apply them as they best seem fit. While some of the social laws are enforced by Baháʼí institutions, the emphasis is placed on individuals following the laws based on their conscience, understanding and reasoning, and Baháʼís are expected to follow the laws for the love of Baháʼu'lláh. The laws are seen as the method of the maintenance of order and security in the world.

== History ==
The Baháʼí Faith had its roots in the Bábí Religion which was started by the Báb in the mid-19th century in Persia. Originally Bábís adhered to the Islamic laws, but this changed when the Báb wrote a Bábí code of law in the Bayán. However, the Báb's laws were not widely practiced by the Bábís, and instead many Bábís became antinomian; they also marked their new religious identity by deliberately not abiding by Islamic practice."

Baháʼu'lláh, in both his initial role as Bábí leader, and then as the founder of his own religious system, condemned the antinomian tendencies of the community. At the request of his followers, he eventually wrote a book of laws, the Kitáb-i-Aqdas, which he completed while he was in Acre, Palestine.

== Sources ==
The main source of Baháʼí law is the Kitáb-i-Aqdas, but it is supplemented by some supplementary texts written by Baháʼu'lláh, as well as further interpretations by ʻAbdu'l-Bahá, and Shoghi Effendi, heads of the religion after Baháʼu'lláh's death, as well as legislation by the Universal House of Justice, the international governing body of the Baháʼís. The writings of Baháʼu'lláh, ʻAbdu'l-Bahá, and Shoghi Effendi are considered fundamental and unchangeable, while the application of some of them depends on decisions by the Universal House of Justice. Legislation by the Universal House of Justice is seen as subsidiary and is subject to alteration and/or repeal by the Universal House of Justice to account for changing circumstances. The laws written by the Báb are not applicable, except when Baháʼu'lláh specifically reiterated them.

Baháʼu'lláh stated that the ordinances of his book of laws were the best method for the maintenance of world order and security, that Baháʼís should obey the laws with "joy and gladness", and that true liberty could be obtained through obedience to God's laws.

== Gradualism ==
Baháʼu'lláh stated that the observance of the laws that he prescribed should be subject to "tact and wisdom", and that they should not cause "disturbance and dissension." Baháʼu'lláh thus provided for the progressive application of his laws. For example, certain Baháʼí laws are only applicable to Middle Eastern Baháʼís (such as the limit to the period of engagement), although any Baháʼí may practice such laws if they so decide. Other Baháʼí laws, such as the prohibition to drink alcohol, have also been applied gradually in countries where they go against social norms, particularly in the early years of the establishment of the Baháʼí Faith in those areas. Shoghi Effendi stated that certain other laws, such as those pertaining to punishment for capital crimes, that are dependent upon the existence of a predominantly Baháʼí society would only be applicable in the future. Furthermore, some laws and teachings are not intended to be applied at the present time and their application depends on future decisions by the Universal House of Justice.

== Individual conscience ==
In Baháʼí literature the laws are not seen as a constricting code, or a ritual, but are described as the "choice wine", and a means to happiness. The laws are generally presented as a set of general principles and guidelines which each individual Baháʼí must apply to their own lives as they see fit. Baháʼí law and teachings do not include details on many aspects of life, and the successive heads of the religion have been reluctant to prescribe specific and detailed codes of Baháʼí behaviour; for example the heads of the religion have stated that details of Baháʼí behaviour, such as how to dress, are a matter of individual choice and not Baháʼí law. This is in contrast to the provisions of Islamic law.

The practice of Baháʼí law is firmly placed on individual conscience, understanding and reasoning. The Baháʼí laws are not considered as binding to anyone until they become a Baháʼí, and becoming a Baháʼí is not conditional on a person's level of adherence to the laws; an individual is expected to gradually apply laws on a personal basis. Baháʼís are expected to follow the laws not because they will be punished for breaking them, but instead because they love Baháʼu'lláh and that they fear God. The teachings of the Baháʼí Faith state that individuals are answerable to God. The observance of personal laws, such as prayer or fasting, is the sole responsibility of the individual, but some laws may be enforced to a degree by Baháʼí institutions, by the loss of Baháʼí administrative rights, if they bring the Baháʼí community into public disrepute.

== Laws and ordinances ==
The Kitáb-i-Aqdas elucidates a number of religious and civil laws that pertain to both individual behavior and the functioning of society. These include the recitation of a daily obligatory prayer; the time of fasting; laws of inheritance; the abolishment of priests; the prohibition of such things as slavery, asceticism, and gambling; the condemnation of backbiting and idleness; the prohibition against and punishments for capital crimes including murder and arson; the requirement for each person to practice a profession; the necessity of educating of children; and the law of strict obedience to one's governments. Baháʼu'lláh's book of laws also includes general principles and exhortations to work with people of all religions with amity, and warns his followers to guard against such things as fanaticism and pride. He also encourages such things as cleanliness and truthfulness.

=== Prayer ===
The act of prayer is one of the most important Baháʼí laws for individual discipline and Baháʼí are enjoined to pray daily. Prayer in the Baháʼí Faith consists of two distinct types, obligatory prayer and devotional (general) prayer. The purpose of prayer in the Baháʼí Faith is to get closer to God and to Baháʼu'lláh and to help better one's own conduct and to request divine assistance.

Baháʼís must individually recite an obligatory prayer each day, using fixed words and form prescribed by Baháʼu'lláh. Obligatory prayer is performed individually while facing the Qiblih, preceded by ablutions. Certain exemptions from obligatory prayer are given to those who are ill, in danger, and women in their courses.

In addition to the daily obligatory prayer, Baháʼí scripture directs believers daily to offer devotional prayer as well as to meditate and study sacred scripture. In contrast with the fixed form prescribed for obligatory prayers, there is no set form for devotions and meditations, though the devotional prayers written by the central figures of the Baháʼí Faith and collected in prayer books are held in high esteem.

=== Fasting ===
The Baháʼí fast is a nineteen-day period of the year, during which Baháʼí are asked adhere to a sunrise-to-sunset fast. Along with obligatory prayer, it is one of the greatest obligations of a Baháʼí, and its chief purpose is spiritual; to reinvigorate the soul and bring the person closer to God.

During the period of fasting, from March 2 through March 20, Baháʼís in good health between the ages of 15 and 70 abstain from eating and drinking. Exemptions are available for people who are travelling, ill, pregnant, nursing, menstruating, or engaged in heavy labour. Fasting is an individual spiritual obligation, and cannot be enforced by Baháʼí institutions.

=== Marriage and family life ===
The Baháʼí teachings recommend marriage, but it is not obligatory. Marriage is emphasized as an assistance to one's self, as well as for the benefit of society; it is seen as both a physical relationship and a spiritual relationship that would continue in all the worlds of God.

The requirements of Baháʼí marriage include that the partners be over the age of 15, and is dependent on the consent of the couple and all their living biological parents, so to strengthen the ties between the families. According to the Baháʼí teachings, sexuality is a normal part of married life and is intended to enhance the relationship. However, sexual relationships are permitted only between a man and woman who are married. This precludes marriages that are homosexual or polygamous as well as any sexual relationship outside of marriage. Interreligious marriages are permitted, and interracial marriages are encouraged. Divorce is permitted, although discouraged, and is granted after a year of separation if the couple is unable to reconcile their differences.

The Baháʼí teachings state that parents need to raise their children to be moral and religious, but not fanatical. Parents are required to provide an education to their children, and children have a duty to obey their parents, which is seen as obeying God. Shoghi Effendi stated that preserving family unity is of utmost importance, and Baháʼís are counselled to balance their desire to serve the religion with their responsibilities as parents, spouses and children.

=== Inheritance ===
In the Kitáb-i-Aqdas, Baháʼu'lláh wrote that all Baháʼís must write a will where they have complete freedom in determining how to dispose of their property. Baháʼu'lláh, however, did create a schedule of inheritance in case of intestacy, that is, when the individual dies without leaving a will. The system of inheritance in the Kitáb-i-Aqdas is based on the provisions written by the Báb and provides for distribution of the deceased's estate among seven categories of heirs.: children, spouse, father, mother, brothers, sisters, and teachers, with higher categories obtaining a larger share. In cases where some of the categories of heirs do not exist, the share falls partly to the children and partly to the Local Spiritual Assembly. The distribution among heirs is uneven: children receive nine parts; the spouse receives eight; the father, seven; the mother, six; the brothers, five; the sisters, four; and the teachers, three.

=== Backbiting and gossip ===
Gossip and backbiting are prohibited and viewed as particularly damaging to the individual and their relationships. Backbiting, speaking of the faults of others in their absence, is described as the greatest sin and the most hated human characteristic. This practice is seen as having a deeply negative effect on the community as well as the individuals involved.

"On no subject are the Baháʼí teachings more emphatic than on the necessity to abstain from fault-finding and backbiting while being ever eager to discover and root out our own faults and overcome our own failings. ..."

=== Alcohol, drugs and tobacco ===
Baháʼís are forbidden to drink alcohol or to take drugs, except by a doctor's order, because God has given human beings reason which is taken away by intoxicants that lead the mind astray. The non-medicinal use of opium and other mind-altering drugs is particularly condemned in the Baháʼí scriptures. Baháʼís are also asked to try to avoid working in jobs that involve the manufacturing or large-scale sale of alcohol and to avoid any involvement in the drug trade. Smoking tobacco is not forbidden but is discouraged.

=== Slavery ===
Baháʼu'lláh formally abolished the practice of slave trading among Baháʼís in the Kitáb-i-Aqdas in 1873. ʻAbdu'l-Bahá and Shoghi Effendi, the authoritative interpreters of the Baháʼí writings, later saw this as a prohibition of slavery itself.

=== Huqúqu'lláh and giving to funds ===
Huqúqu'lláh, the "Right of God", is a law which requires Baháʼís to pay 19% of their surplus net-worth (i.e. those things that they do not need to live comfortably), after the discharge of all debts. The sum is calculated annually; however, it is paid only if the annual net worth amount increases - if their net worth stays the same or decreases the amount of Huqúqu'lláh is zero.

Payment is an individual spiritual obligation, and is seen as a spiritual bounty to bring the individual closer to God. No Baháʼí can be solicited for it, and the contribution is confidential and a personal matter. The money collected is used by the Universal House of Justice for such things as the promotion of the religion, the upkeep of properties, and general charity.

Baháʼís are also expected to make financial contributions to Baháʼí funds. However, contributions are strictly confidential, including whether or not a believer makes one, and is up to individual discretion. Donations are never solicited, and contributions are not accepted from non-Baháʼí sources.

=== Other laws ===
Other laws that have been prescribed in the Kitáb-i-Aqdas include:

- Pilgrimage to be one of two places: the House of Baháʼu'lláh (destroyed) in Baghdad, and the House of the Báb (destroyed) in Shiraz.
- The holding of a Nineteen Day Feast which are regular community gatherings, occurring on the first day of each month of the Baháʼí calendar and consist of a devotional, administrative, and social part.
- After death it is forbidden to carry the body more than one hour's journey from municipal boundary of the place of death. The body should be wrapped in a shroud of silk or cotton and placed in a coffin made of polished stone, crystal or hard wood. A specific prayer must be read before burial.
- Engaging in a trade or profession is made obligatory and is exalted to the rank of worship.
- Being obedient to the government of one's country. Civil law takes priority over Baháʼí religious law.
- The compulsory education of children.
- Repetition of the Greatest Name 95 times a day.
- The hunting of animals is allowed provided that the name of God is invoked before hunting. If the game is found dead in a net or trap its consumption is not allowed.
- If someone comes upon a treasure trove, one third of the treasure is the right of the discoverer, and the other two thirds is the right of the House of Justice. This law is designed for a future state of society and these matters are currently covered by the civil law of each country.
- If someone comes upon lost property in a town, they must try to find the owner and wait one year before taking possession. If the property is of significantly small value, they must wait one day. If the property is found in an uninhabited area, they must wait three days. This law is designed for a future state of society and these matters are currently covered by the civil law of each country.

=== Other prohibitions ===
Prohibitions included in the Kitáb-i-Aqdas include:

- Believing personal interpretations of the Baháʼí writings as authoritative (ʻAbdu'l-Bahá and Shoghi Effendi were the only approved interpreters of Baháʼu'lláh's writings).
- Asceticism
- Monasticism
- Begging
- Clergy
- Use of Pulpits
- The kissing of hands (As a form of obeisance)
- Confession of sins
- Gambling
- Homosexual acts
- Cruelty to animals
- Sloth
- Calumny
- The carrying of arms unless essential.
- Assault
- Shaving of one's head.
- Adultery and sexual intercourse between unmarried couples: Sexual intercourse between unmarried couples is punishable by a fine paid to the Local Spiritual Assembly; the penalty for adultery is left to the Universal House of Justice. If the offense (adultery) should be repeated the fine is doubled.
- Arson: The punishment for arson is either the death penalty or life imprisonment. If the death penalty is applied, the convicted person is killed by burning. The details of the law such as the degree of the offence and the circumstances are to be taken into account to decide which of the two sentences is to be selected has been left to the Universal House of Justice. The Universal House of Justice has stated that the law is intended for a future condition of society, at which time they will be supplemented and applied by the Universal House of Justice; the Universal House of Justice has written "In relation to arson, this depends on what 'house' is burned. There is obviously a tremendous difference in the degree of offence between the person who burns down an empty warehouse and one who sets fire to a school full of children."
- Murder: murder is punishable by the death penalty or life imprisonment. The details of the law such as the degree of the offence and the circumstances that are to be taken into account to decide which of the two sentences are to be selected has been left to the Universal House of Justice; the Universal House of Justice has stated that the law is intended for a future condition of society, at which time they will be supplemented and applied by the Universal House of Justice. In the case of manslaughter, it is necessary to pay a specified indemnity to the family of the deceased.
- Theft: Theft is punishable by either imprisonment or exile; on the third offence, however, a mark should be placed upon the thief's brow so it is easy to identify the person and disallow him in the "cities of God". The purpose of the mark on the forehead serves in warning other people of the thief's proclivities. The details of the nature of the mark (how the mark is to be applied, how long it has to be worn, and under what conditions it may be removed) and the circumstances that are to be taken into account in deciding which sentence is to be applied have been left to the Universal House of Justice; the Universal House of Justice has stated that the law is intended for a future condition of society, at which time they will be supplemented and applied by the Universal House of Justice.

== See also ==
- Baháʼí literature
- Baháʼí teachings
- Ecclesiastical ordinances
- Kitáb-i-Aqdas
