= Huqúqu'lláh =

Socio-economic and spiritual law of the Baháʼí Faith

Ḥuqúqu'lláh (Arabic: ﺣﻘﻮﻕ ﺍﻟﻠﻪ, "Right of God") is a voluntary wealth tax paid by adherents of the Baháʼí Faith to support the work of the religion. Individuals following the practice calculate 19% of their discretionary income (after-tax income minus essential expenses) and send it to the head of the religion, which since 1963 has been the Universal House of Justice.

Ḥuqúqu'lláh is a Baháʼí law established by Baháʼu'lláh in the Kitáb-i-Aqdas in 1873. It is separate and distinct from the general Baháʼí funds. It provides for the financial security of the community by funding promotional activities and the upkeep of properties, and it is a basis for a future welfare program.

The Ḥuqúqu'lláh payment is considered a way to purify one's possessions. It is an individual obligation; nobody in the general community should know who has or has not contributed, nor should anyone be solicited individually for funds. Along with several other practices, it was initially only applicable to Baháʼís of the Middle East until 1992, when the authoritative English translation of the Kitáb-i-Aqdas was published and the Universal House of Justice made Ḥuqúqu'lláh universally applicable. A central office to receive payments was established at the Baháʼí World Centre in 1991, and payments are made to trustees appointed by the Universal House of Justice in every country or region.

The obligation is similar to the Shia practice of khums: a 20% wealth tax payable to the Imams.

== History ==
=== Gradual implementation ===
Baháʼu'lláh wrote down the law of Huqúqu'lláh in the Kitáb-i-Aqdas in 1873, but he did not accept any payments initially. He delayed the release of the Kitáb-i-Aqdas because of apprehension that the law of Huqúq might be difficult to implement, or that some would assume that the money was for his personal use. When copies were sent to Iran, they came with instructions that Huqúqu'lláh was not to be implemented, and it remained thus for about 5 years, during which time Baháʼu'lláh returned money to donors. In 1878 he appointed the first trustee of Huqúqu'lláh, who had the responsibility of receiving the Huqúq, as it is known, from the Baháʼís in Iran. The majority of these donations were spent caring for the poor and needy of the community, or for teaching efforts. Baháʼu'lláh and his family led an austere life.

According to Baháʼí author Adib Taherzadeh,

During Baha'u'llah's Ministry the law of Huquq was applicable to only a very small number of Baha'is. The great majority of the community were poor and not eligible to pay the Huquq. Often the Trustee of Baha'u'llah was unable to fully cover the expenses of the Baha'i teachers and those in need.

Later the practice of Huqúqu'lláh was expanded to the Baháʼís of the Middle East.

In 1985 information about the Huqúq was distributed worldwide and in 1992 the law was made universally applicable. As the number of payments increased, deputies and representatives to receive the payments have been appointed. In 1991 the central office of Huqúqu'lláh was established at the Baháʼí World Centre in Haifa, Israel.

=== Timeline ===
The following is a basic timeline related to Ḥuqúqu'lláh, including trustees.

- Revelation of the Kitáb-i-Aqdas (1873)
- Amínu'l-Bayán (1878–1881)
- Hájí Amín, Amín-i-Iláhi (1881–1928)
- Hájí Ghulám-Ridá; Amín-i-Amín (1928–1938)
- Valíyu'lláh Varqá (1938–1955)
- ʻAlí-Muhammad Varqá (1955–2007)
- Compilation Ḥuqúqu'lláh (1985)
- Central office of Ḥuqúqu'lláh (1991)
- Kitáb-i-Aqdas in English, Law of Ḥuqúqu'lláh universally applicable (1992–present)

== Purpose ==
The Ḥuquq'ullah is not meant to be a donation, but is rather meant to be a claim by God for support of the interests of all people. It is partly used to equalize wealth across different parts of the world. The payment of the Ḥuquq'ullah is also meant to increase the spiritual link between the religion's central institutions and the individual. This offering is to be considered separate from giving to the various Baháʼí funds and takes precedence over them. Furthermore, the Ḥuquq'ullah should not be solicited by anyone, and no payments of it can be accepted unless the individual was doing so "with the utmost joy".

== Calculation ==
The payment of Ḥuqúqu'lláh is based on the calculation of the value of the individual's possessions, which includes one's merchandise, property and income, after all necessary expenses have been paid. If a person has possessions or wealth in excess of what is necessary equal in value to at least nineteen mithqáls of gold (2.2246 ounces or 69 grams) it is a spiritual obligation to pay nineteen percent of the total amount, once only, as Ḥuqúqu'lláh. Thereafter, whenever an individual acquires more possessions or wealth from income by the amount of at least nineteen mithqáls of gold, one is to pay nineteen percent of this increase, and so on for each further increase.

Certain categories of possessions are exempt from the payment of the Ḥuqúqu'lláh, such as one's residence, necessary household furnishings, business or professional equipment and furnishings, and others. Baháʼu'lláh has left it to the individual to decide which items are considered necessary and which are not. Specific provisions are outlined to cover cases of financial loss, the failure of investments to yield a profit and for the payment of the Ḥuqúqu'lláh in the event of the person's death.

== Role in succession of authority ==
During the lifetime of Baháʼu'lláh, the Ḥuqúqu'lláh offerings were made directly to him, and following his death, to ʻAbdu'l-Bahá. In his Will and Testament, ʻAbdu'l-Bahá indicated that payments should go to the appointed Guardian and named Shoghi Effendi as the first of potentially many Guardians, following primogeniture. After Shoghi Effendi died without appointing a successor, the custodial Hands of the Cause headed the Faith until the first election of the Universal House of Justice.

== See also ==
- Baháʼí laws
- Socio-economic development (Baháʼí)
