= Baháʼí views on homosexuality =

LGBTQ+ sexuality and the Bahá'í Faith

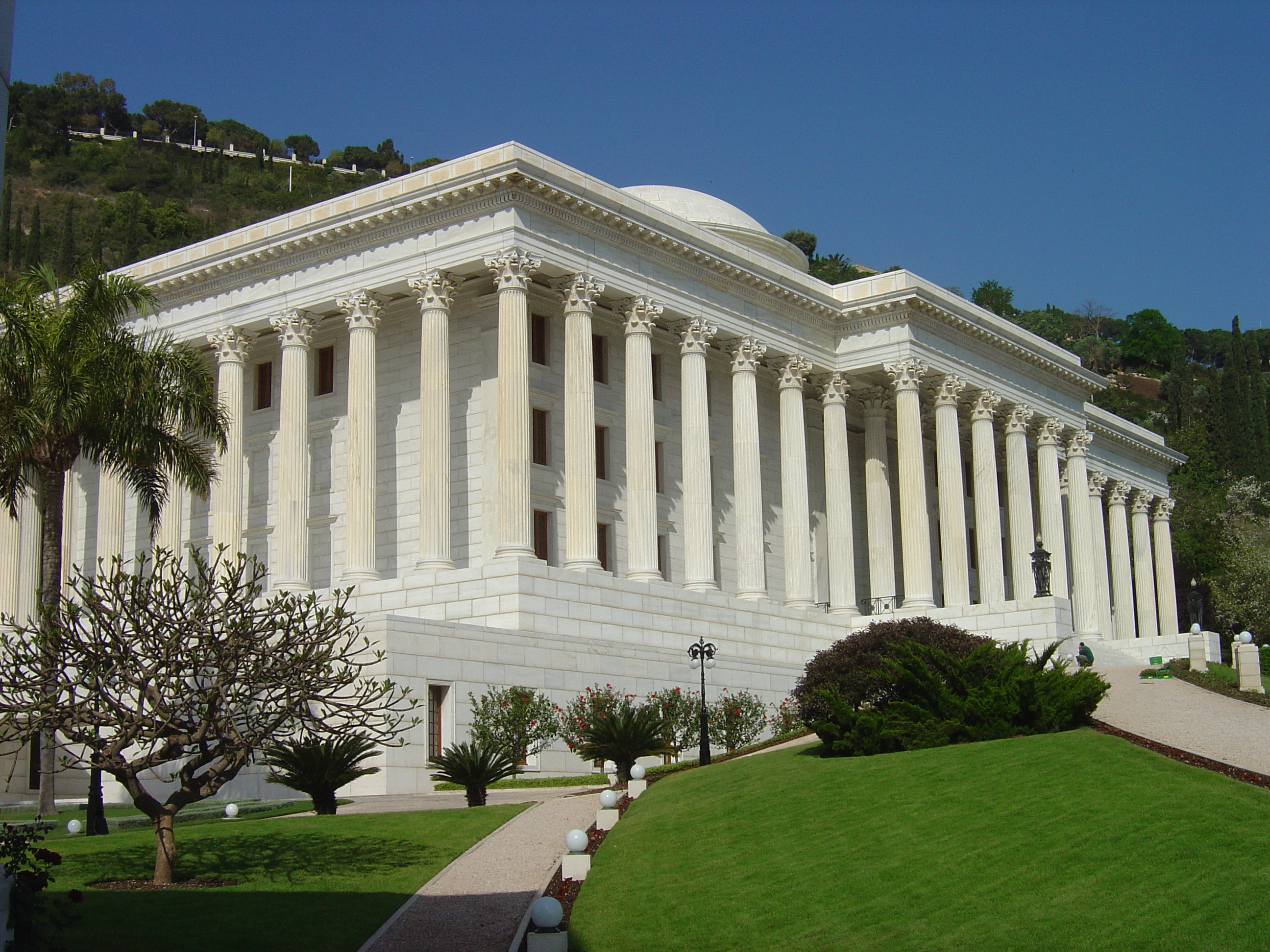
Seat of the Universal House of Justice, the supreme governing body of the Baha'i Faith, in the city of Haifa, Israel.

The Baháʼí Faith has an emphasis on what it describes as traditional family values, and marriage between a man and a woman is the only form of sexual relationship permitted for Baháʼís. With an emphasis on chastity and restraint outside of matrimony, Baháʼí practices exclude premarital, extramarital, or homosexual intimacy. Baháʼí institutions have taken no position on the sexual practices of those who are not adherents, and Baháʼís have been discouraged from promoting or opposing efforts to legalize same-sex marriage.

The scriptural basis for Baháʼí practices comes from the writings of Baháʼu'lláh (1817–1892), the faith's founder, who forbade adultery and sodomy. The Baháʼí position towards homosexuality was elaborated on by Shoghi Effendi, Baháʼu'lláh's great grandson and appointed head of the religion from 1921 to 1957. He answered specific questions and described homosexuality as an affliction that should be overcome, while leaving Baháʼí membership open to anyone regardless of sexual orientation. This position leaves Baháʼís with a same-sex orientation under similar guidance as a heterosexual person: if they find themselves unable to contract a marriage with someone of the opposite sex, they should remain celibate.

The supreme governing institution of the Baháʼí Faith is the Universal House of Justice, first elected in 1963, which has written more extensively on the subject of homosexuality. For example, they have clarified that Baháʼís should not single out homosexual practice over other transgressions of Baháʼí conduct, should not treat those with a homosexual orientation with disdain or prejudice, and should not attempt to impose their standards on society.

== Further discussion ==
The exclusion of same-sex marriage among Baháʼís has garnered considerable criticism in the Western world, where the Baháʼí teachings on sexuality "may appear to be unreasonable, dogmatic, and difficult to apply in Western society". Particularly in the United States, Baháʼís have attempted to reconcile their conservative teachings on sexuality with the otherwise socially progressive teachings of the Faith, but it continues to be a source of controversy.

The Universal House of Justice in 2014 acknowledged that the Baháʼí perspective on sexuality "departs sharply from the pattern of thought achieving ascendancy in many societies" and Baháʼís "cannot relinquish their principles because of changing trends in popular thought".

Former Baháʼí William Garlington said the Baháʼí position in America, "can at most be characterized as one of sympathetic disapproval" toward homosexuality, and professor Melissa Wilcox describes Baháʼí teachings as leaving "little room for tolerance of same-sex eroticism", "not given to statements of its disapproval", and "not generally vocally anti-LGBT."

In the faith's teachings homosexuality is described as a condition against nature and a challenge that an individual should control and overcome, and Baháʼís are left to apply the teachings at their own discretion, and are discouraged from singling out same-sex sexual activity over other transgressions, such as the consumption of alcohol, or heterosexual extramarital sex. Membership in the Baháʼí community is open to celibate lesbian and gay adherents.

The Baháʼí Faith has been described as a religion "ambiguous or contested on the issue of LGBTQ inclusion". The religion has a strong emphasis on traditional interpretations of teachings found in Abrahamic religions, which discourage pre- and extra-marital sex as well as same-sex romantic relationships and marriage. Baháʼí teachings state that Baháʼís should not treat homosexual people as condemned outcasts, nor expect people who are not Baháʼí to follow Baháʼí laws. The Baháʼí writings teach adherents to treat everyone with respect and dignity, and to eschew an attitude of discrimination and social intolerance toward lesbian, gay, and bisexual people. The opportunity for civil same-sex marriage was mentioned in a 2010 letter by the Universal House of Justice as being a public issue that is not in keeping with the Baháʼí teachings, but one that Baháʼís "would neither promote nor necessarily oppose."

== See also ==
- Homosexuality and religion
- Baháʼí teachings
