= Baháʼí Faith =

Religion established by Baháʼu'lláh

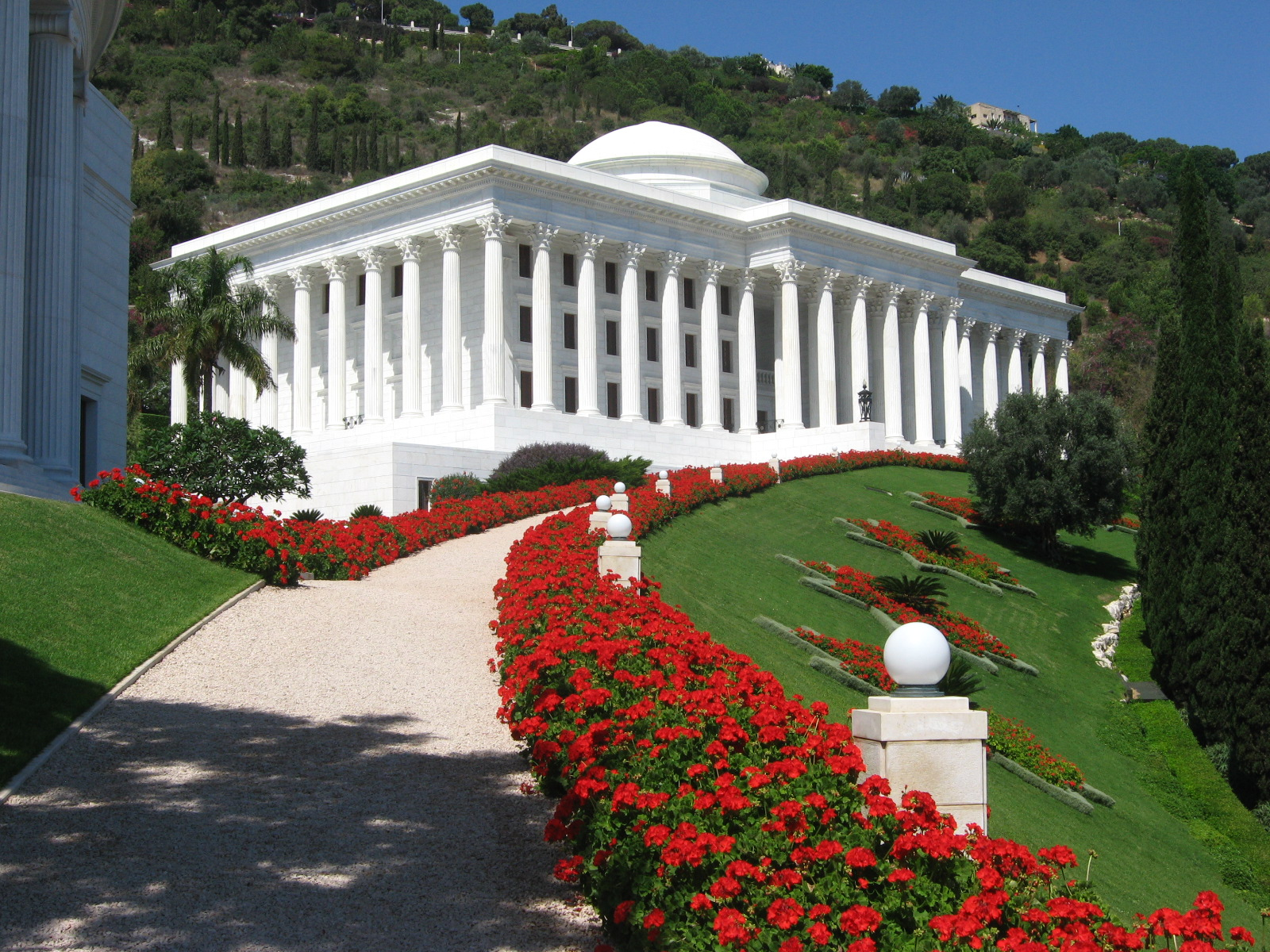
- Seat of the Universal House of Justice, governing body of the Baháʼís, in Haifa.
- Classification: Abrahamic
- Scripture: Kitáb-i-Aqdas, Kitáb-i-Íqán, The Hidden Words, and other Baháʼí literatures
- Theology: Monotheistic
- Region: Worldwide
- Headquarters: Baháʼí World Centre
- Founder: Baháʼu'lláh
- Origin: 19th century Qajar Iran
- Members: 7–8 million
- Official website: bahai.org

The Baháʼí Faith is a religion, (Note: The Baháʼí Faith is variously described as a 'religion', 'sect', 'relatively new religion', 'world religion', 'major world religion', 'megareligion', 'independent world religion', 'new religious movement', 'alternative religion', and other attempts to convey that it is new (relative to well-established faiths), not mainstream, and with no racial or national focus.) established by Baháʼu'lláh in the 19th century that teaches the essential worth of all religions and the unity of all people. (Note: Sources summarize the Baháʼí Faith as teaching, "the essential worth of all religions, the unity of all peoples, and the equality of the sexes", "the essential unity of all religions and the unity of humanity", "the spiritual unity of mankind and advocates peace and universal education", "the unity of all peoples under God", or "religious unity... the Oneness of Humanity... the equality of all human beings regardless of race, ethnicity, gender, or social class".) It initially developed in Iran and parts of Western Asia, where it has faced ongoing persecution since its inception. The religion has 7–8 million adherents, known as Baháʼís, who are spread throughout most of the world's countries and territories. (Note: See Baháʼí Faith by country for various estimates.)

The Baháʼí Faith has three central figures: the Báb (1819–1850), executed for heresy, who taught that a prophet similar to Jesus and Muhammad would soon appear; Baháʼu'lláh, who claimed in 1863 to be the expected prophet and who had to endure both exile and imprisonment; and his son, ʻAbdu'l-Bahá (1844–1921), who made teaching trips to Europe and the United States after his release from confinement in 1908. After ʻAbdu'l-Bahá's death in 1921, the leadership of the religion fell to his grandson Shoghi Effendi (1897–1957). Baháʼís annually elect local, regional, and national administrative bodies that govern the religion's affairs, and every five years an election is held for the Universal House of Justice, the nine-member governing institution of the worldwide Baháʼí community that is located in Haifa, Israel, near the Shrine of the Báb.

According to Baháʼí teachings, religion is revealed in an orderly and progressive way by a single God through Manifestations of God, who are the founders of major world religions throughout human history; the Buddha, Jesus, and Muhammad are cited as the most recent of these Manifestations of God before the Báb and Baháʼu'lláh. Baháʼís regard the world's major religions as fundamentally unified in their purpose, but divergent in their social practices and interpretations. The Baháʼí Faith stresses the unity of all people as its core teaching; as a result, it explicitly rejects notions of racism, sexism, and nationalism. At the heart of Baháʼí teachings is the vision of a unified world order that ensures the prosperity of all nations, races, creeds, and classes.

Letters and epistles by Baháʼu'lláh, along with writings and talks by his son ʻAbdu'l-Bahá, have been collected and assembled into a canon of Baháʼí scriptures. This collection also includes works by the Báb, who is regarded as Baháʼu'lláh's forerunner. Prominent among the works of Baháʼí literature are the Kitáb-i-Aqdas, the Kitáb-i-Íqán, Some Answered Questions, God Passes By, and The Dawn-Breakers.

== Etymology ==
The word "Baháʼí" (/bɑːhɑːˈi/, /bəhaɪ/; بهائی) is used either as an adjective to refer to the Baháʼí Faith or as a term for a follower of Baháʼu'lláh. The proper name of the religion is the "Baháʼí Faith", not Baháʼí or Baháʼism (the latter, once common among academics, is regarded as derogatory by the Baháʼís). It is derived from the Arabic "Baháʼ" (بهاء), a name Baháʼu'lláh chose for himself, referring to the 'glory' or 'splendor' of God. In English, the word is commonly pronounced bə-HYE (/bəˈhaɪ/), but the more accurate rendering of the Arabic is bə-HAH-ee (/bəˈhɑː.iː/).

The accent marks above the letters, representing long vowels, derive from a system of transliterating Arabic and Persian script that was adopted by Baháʼís in 1923, and which has been used in almost all Baháʼí publications since. Baháʼís prefer the orthographies Baháʼí, the Báb, Baháʼu'lláh, and ʻAbdu'l-Bahá. When accent marks are unavailable, Bahaʼi or Bahaʼuʼllah are often used.

== History ==
Baháʼí timeline
1817	Baháʼu'lláh is born in Tehran, Iran
1819	The Báb is born in Shiraz, Iran
1844	The Báb declares his mission in Shiraz, Iran
1850	The Báb is publicly executed in Tabriz, Iran
1852	Thousands of Bábís are executed following an attempted assassination of Shah Naser al-Din Shah Qajar.
	Baháʼu'lláh is imprisoned and forced into exile
1863	Baháʼu'lláh first announces his claim to divine revelation in Baghdad, Iraq.
	Baháʼu'lláh is forced to leave Baghdad for Constantinople, then Adrianople
1868	Baháʼu'lláh is forced into harsher confinement in ʻAkká
1892	Baháʼu'lláh dies near ʻAkká
	Baháʼu'lláh's will appoints his eldest son ʻAbdu'l-Bahá as successor
1908	ʻAbdu'l-Bahá is released from prison
1921	ʻAbdu'l-Bahá dies in Haifa, marking the end of the Heroic Age (or Apostolic or Primitive Age) of the Baháʼí Faith, which spans from 1844 to 1921.
	ʻAbdu'l-Bahá's will appoints his grandson Shoghi Effendi as Guardian of the Baháʼí Faith
1957	Shoghi Effendi dies in England
1963	The Universal House of Justice is first elected

The Baháʼí Faith traces its beginnings to the religion of the Báb and the Shaykhi movement that immediately preceded it. The Báb was a merchant who began preaching in 1844 that he was the bearer of a new revelation from God, but was rejected by the generality of Islamic clergy in Iran, ending in his public execution in 1850 for the crime of heresy. The Báb taught that God would soon send a new messenger, and Baháʼís consider Baháʼu'lláh to be that person. Although recognized as a messenger in his own right, the Báb is so interwoven into Baháʼí theology and history that Baháʼís celebrate his birth, death, and declaration as holy days, and consider him one of their three central figures (along with Baháʼu'lláh and ʻAbdu'l-Bahá). A historical account of the Bábí movement (The Dawn-Breakers) is considered one of three books that every Baháʼí should "master" and read "over and over again".

The Baháʼí community was mostly confined to the Iranian and Ottoman empires until after the death of Baháʼu'lláh in 1892; at that time, he had followers in 13 countries of Asia and Africa. Under the leadership of his son, ʻAbdu'l-Bahá, the religion gained a footing in Europe and America, and was consolidated in Iran, where it still suffers intense persecution. ʻAbdu'l-Bahá's death in 1921 marks the end of what Baháʼís call the "heroic age" of the religion.

=== Báb ===
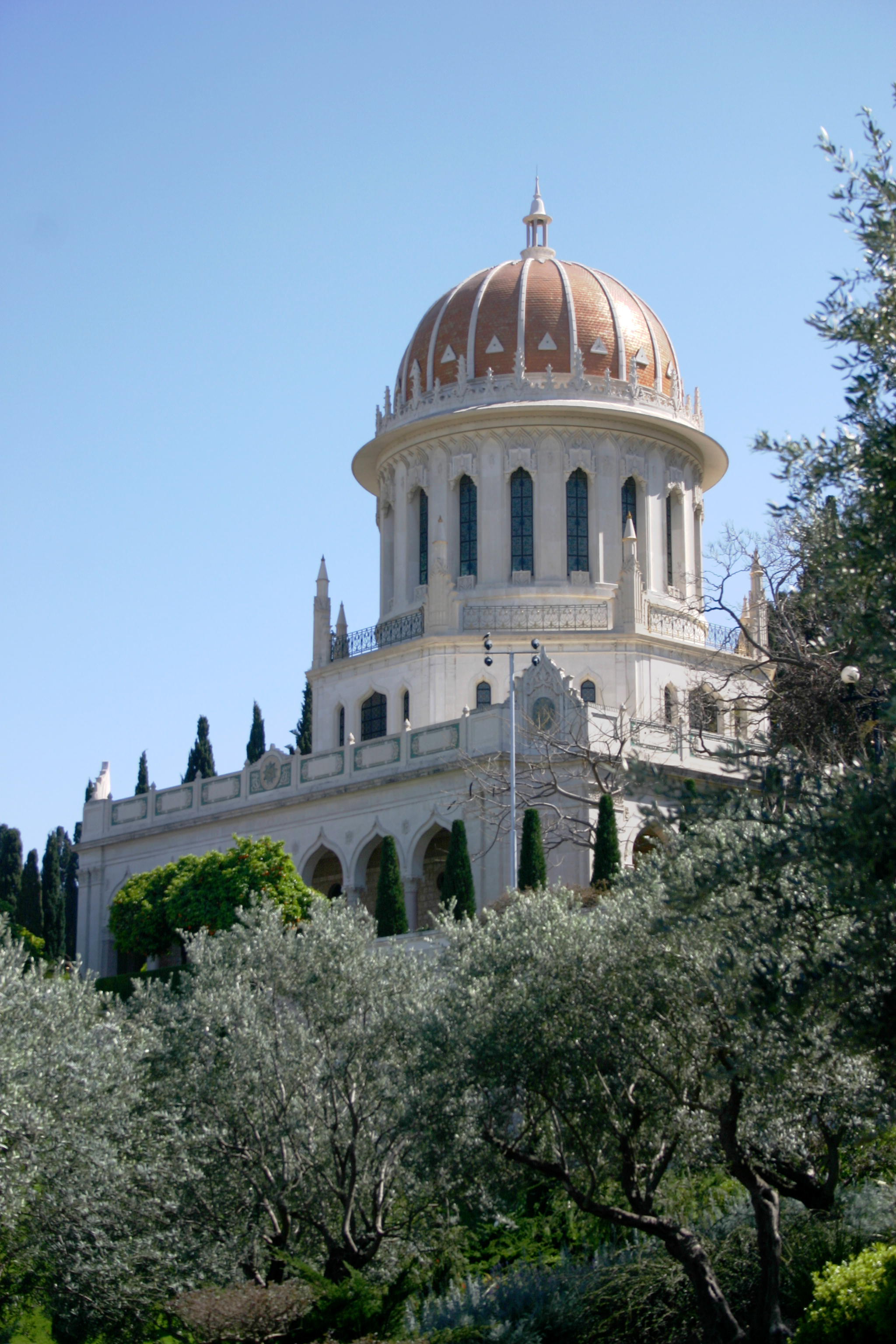
Shrine of the Báb in Haifa, Israel

On the evening of 22 May 1844, Siyyid ʻAlí-Muhammad of Shiraz gained his first convert and took on the title of "the Báb" (الباب, 'Gate'), referring to his later claim to the status of Mahdi of Shia Islam. His followers were known as Bábís. As the Báb's teachings spread, which the Islamic clergy saw as blasphemous, his followers came under increased persecution and torture. The conflicts escalated in several places to military sieges by Shah Naser al-Din Shah Qajar's army. The Báb himself was imprisoned and eventually executed in 1850.

Baháʼís see the Báb as the forerunner of the Baháʼí Faith, because the Báb's writings introduced the concept of "He whom God shall make manifest", a messianic figure whose coming, according to Baháʼís, was announced in the scriptures of all of the world's great religions, and whom Baháʼu'lláh, the founder of the Baháʼí Faith, claimed to be. The Báb's tomb, located on Mount Carmel in Haifa, Israel, is an important place of pilgrimage for Baháʼís. The remains of the Báb were brought secretly from Iran to the Holy Land and eventually interred in the tomb built for them in a spot specifically designated by Baháʼu'lláh. The writings of the Báb are considered inspired scripture by Baháʼís, though having been superseded by the laws and teachings of Baháʼu'lláh. Extracts of the main written works of the Báb translated into English are compiled in Selections from the Writings of the Báb (1976) out of the estimated 135 works.

=== Baháʼu'lláh ===
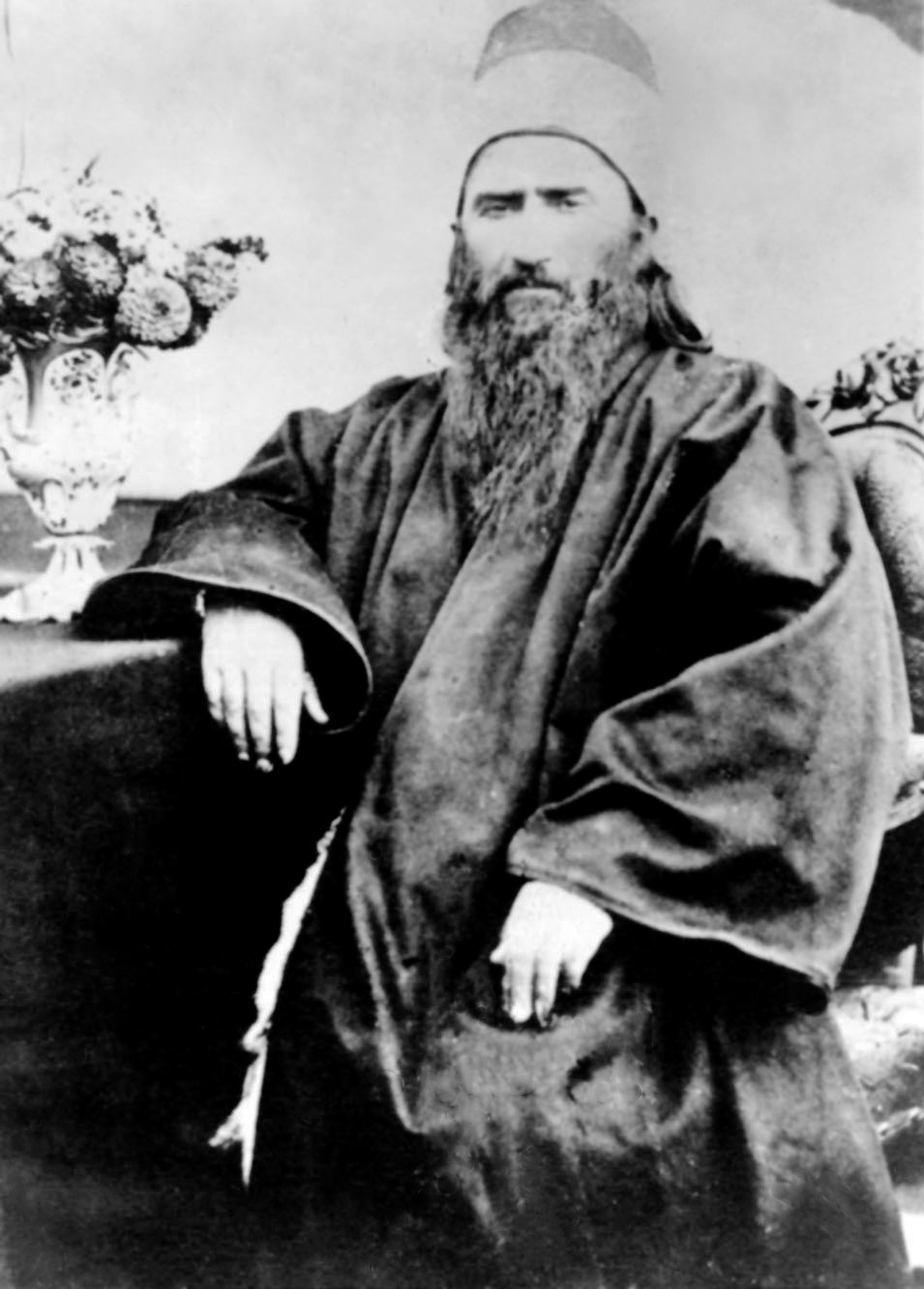
Baháʼu'lláh, the founder of the Baháʼí Faith

Mírzá Husayn ʻAlí Núrí was one of the early followers of the Báb, and later took the title of Baháʼu'lláh. In August 1852, a few Bábís made a failed attempt to assassinate the shah, Naser al-Din Shah Qajar. The shah responded by ordering the killing and, in some cases, torturing of about fifty Bábís in Tehran. Further bloodshed spread throughout the country, and hundreds were reported killed in newspapers of the period by October, and tens of thousands were killed by the end of December. Baháʼu'lláh himself was not involved in the assassination attempt, but was nonetheless imprisoned in the Síyáh-Chál dungeon of Tehran until his release was obtained four months later through the intervention of the Russian ambassador. After his expulsion from Iran, Baháʼu'lláh traveled to Baghdad, then part of the Ottoman Empire, where he joined other Bábís in exile.

In Baghdad, his leadership revived the persecuted followers of the Báb back in Iran, so Iranian authorities requested his removal, instigating a summons to Constantinople (now Istanbul) from the Ottoman Sultan. In 1863, at the time of his removal from Baghdad, Baháʼu'lláh first announced his claim of prophethood to his family and followers, which he said had come to him years earlier while in the Síyáh-Chál dungeon of Tehran. From the time of the initial exile from Iran, tensions grew between him and Subh-i-Azal, the appointed leader of the Bábís, who did not recognize Baháʼu'lláh's claim. Throughout the rest of his life, Baháʼu'lláh gained the allegiance of almost all of the Bábís, who came to be known as Baháʼís, while a remnant of Bábís became known as Azalis, and are regarded by modern-day Bahá'ís as apostates.

He spent less than four months in Constantinople. The Ottoman authorities turned against him as a result of a campaign of defamation by the Persian ambassador, and the sultan's government decreed a further exile to Adrianople (now Edirne), to which Bahá'u'lláh responded with a letter voicing severe chastisement. There in Adrianople, he was placed under house arrest, and he remained there for four years, until a royal decree of 1868 banished all Bábís to either Cyprus or ʻAkká.

It was in or near the Ottoman penal colony of ʻAkká (now Acre in Israel) that Baháʼu'lláh spent the remainder of his life. After initially strict and harsh confinement, he was allowed to live in a home near ʻAkká, while still officially a prisoner of that city. He died there in 1892. Baháʼís regard his resting place at Bahjí as the Qiblih to which they turn in prayer each day.

He produced over 18,000 works in his lifetime, in both Arabic and Persian, of which only 8% have been translated into English. During the period in Adrianople, he began declaring his mission as a Messenger of God in letters to the world's religious and secular rulers, including Pope Pius IX, Napoleon III, and Queen Victoria.

=== ʻAbdu'l-Bahá ===
ʻAbdu'l-Bahá, the eldest son of Baháʼu'lláh

ʻAbbás Effendi was Baháʼu'lláh's eldest son, who chose for himself the title of ʻAbdu'l-Bahá ("Servant of Bahá"). His father left a will that appointed ʻAbdu'l-Bahá as the leader of the Baháʼí community. ʻAbdu'l-Bahá had shared his father's long exile and imprisonment, which continued until ʻAbdu'l-Bahá's own release as a result of the Young Turk Revolution in 1908. Following his release, he led a life of travelling, speaking, teaching, and maintaining correspondence with communities of believers and individuals, expounding the principles of the Baháʼí Faith. Bahá'ís consider ʻAbdu'l-Bahá to be a perfect exemplar of the Baháʼí teachings.

As of 2020, there are over 38,000 extant documents containing the words of ʻAbdu'l-Bahá, which are of widely varying lengths. Only a fraction of these documents have been translated into English. Among the more well known are The Secret of Divine Civilization, Some Answered Questions, the Tablet to Auguste-Henri Forel, the Tablets of the Divine Plan, and the Tablet to The Hague. Additionally notes taken of a number of his talks were published in various volumes like Paris Talks during his journeys to the West.

=== Shoghi Effendi ===
Baháʼu'lláh's Kitáb-i-Aqdas and The Will and Testament of ʻAbdu'l-Bahá are foundational documents of the Baháʼí administrative order. Baháʼu'lláh established the elected Universal House of Justice, and ʻAbdu'l-Bahá established the appointed hereditary Guardianship and clarified the relationship between the two institutions. In his Will, ʻAbdu'l-Bahá appointed Shoghi Effendi, his eldest grandson, as the first Guardian of the Baháʼí Faith. Shoghi Effendi served for 36 years as the head of the religion until his death in 1957.

Throughout his lifetime, Shoghi Effendi translated Baháʼí texts; developed global plans for the expansion of the Baháʼí community; developed the Baháʼí World Centre; carried on a voluminous correspondence with communities and individuals around the world; and built the administrative structure of the religion, preparing the community for the election of the Universal House of Justice.

In 1937, Shoghi Effendi launched a seven-year plan for the Baháʼís of North America, followed by another in 1946. In 1953, he launched the first international plan, the Ten Year Crusade. This plan included extremely ambitious goals for the expansion of Baháʼí communities and institutions, the translation of Baháʼí texts into several new languages, and the sending of Baháʼí pioneers into previously unreached nations. He announced in letters during the Ten Year Crusade that it would be followed by other plans under the direction of the Universal House of Justice, which was elected in 1963 at the culmination of the Ten Year Crusade.

Shoghi Effendi died unexpectedly after a brief illness on 4 November 1957 in London, England, under conditions that did not allow for a successor to be appointed. He is buried in New Southgate Cemetery in Barnet, London.

=== Universal House of Justice ===
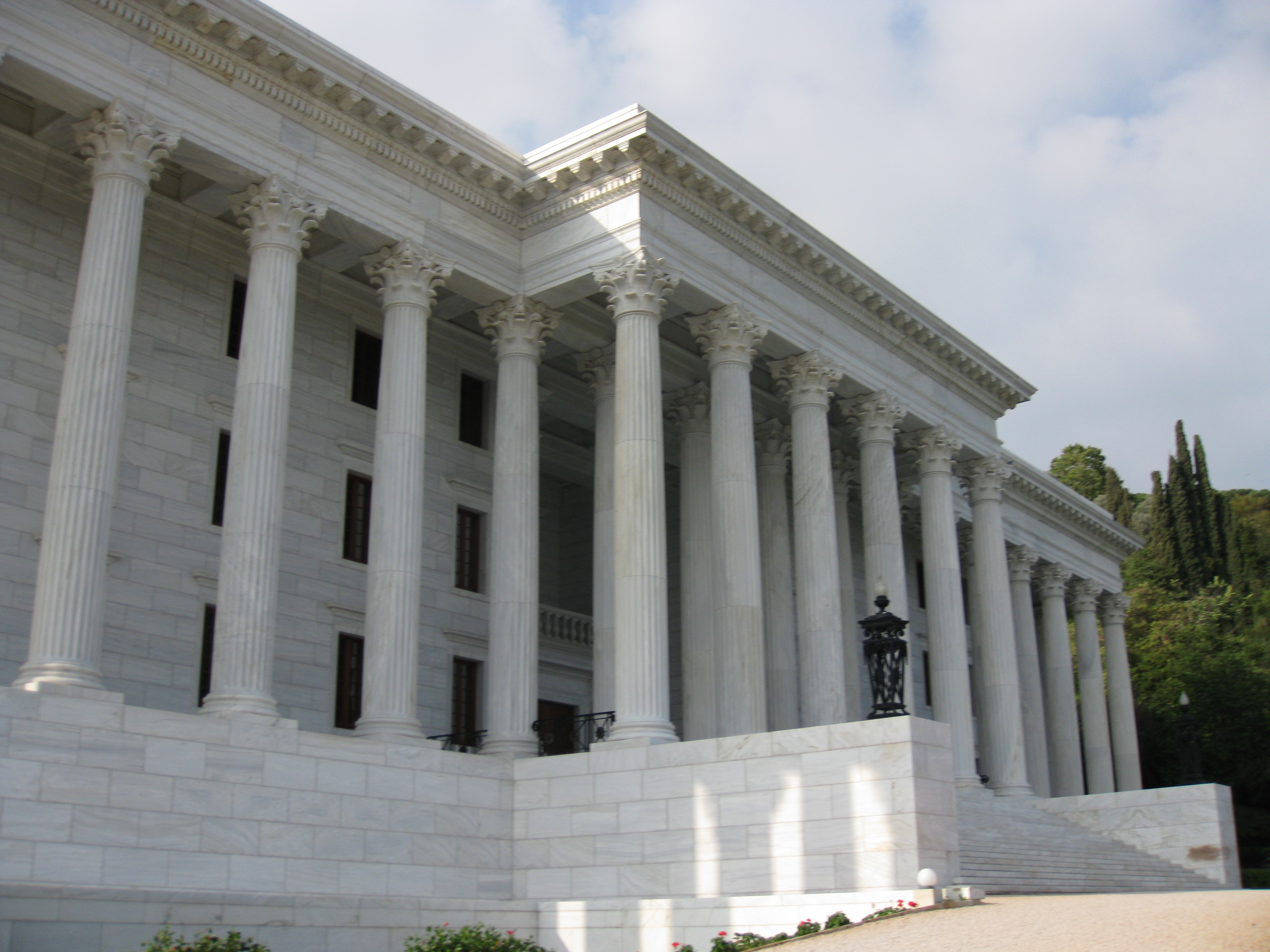
The Seat of the Universal House of Justice was completed in 1982.

Since 1963, the Universal House of Justice has been the elected head of the Baháʼí Faith. The general functions of this body are defined through the writings of Baháʼu'lláh and clarified in the writings of Abdu'l-Bahá and Shoghi Effendi. These functions include teaching and education, implementing Baháʼí laws, addressing social issues, and caring for the weak and the poor.

Starting with the Nine-Year Plan that began in 1964, the Universal House of Justice has directed the work of the Baháʼí community through a series of multi-year international plans. The Baháʼí leadership sought to continue the expansion of the religion but also to "consolidate" new members, meaning to increase their knowledge of the Baháʼí teachings. In this vein, in the 1970s, the Ruhi Institute was founded by Baháʼís in Colombia to offer short courses on Baháʼí beliefs, ranging in length from a weekend to nine days. The associated Ruhi Foundation, whose purpose was to systematically "consolidate" new Baháʼís, was registered in 1992, and since the late 1990s, the courses of the Ruhi Institute have been the dominant way of deepening in the Baháʼí Faith around the world. By 2013, there were over 300 Baháʼí training institutes around the world and 100,000 people participating in courses. The courses of the Ruhi Institute train communities to self-organize classes for the spiritual education of children and youth, among other activities. Additional lines of action the Universal House of Justice has encouraged for the contemporary Baháʼí community include social action and participation in the prevalent discourses of society.

Annually, on 21 April, the Universal House of Justice sends a 'Ridván' message to the worldwide Baháʼí community, that updates Baháʼís on current developments and provides further guidance for the year to come. (Note: All Ridván messages can be found at Bahai.org.)

At local, regional, and national levels, Baháʼís elect members to nine-person Spiritual Assemblies, which run the affairs of the religion. There are also appointed individuals working at various levels, including locally and internationally, who perform the function of propagating the teachings and protecting the community. The latter do not serve as clergy, as the Baháʼí Faith does not have clergy. The Universal House of Justice remains the supreme governing body of the Baháʼí Faith, and its 9 members are elected every five years by the members of all National Spiritual Assemblies. Any male Baháʼí, 21 years or older, is eligible to be elected to the Universal House of Justice; all other positions are open to male and female Baháʼís.

== Beliefs ==
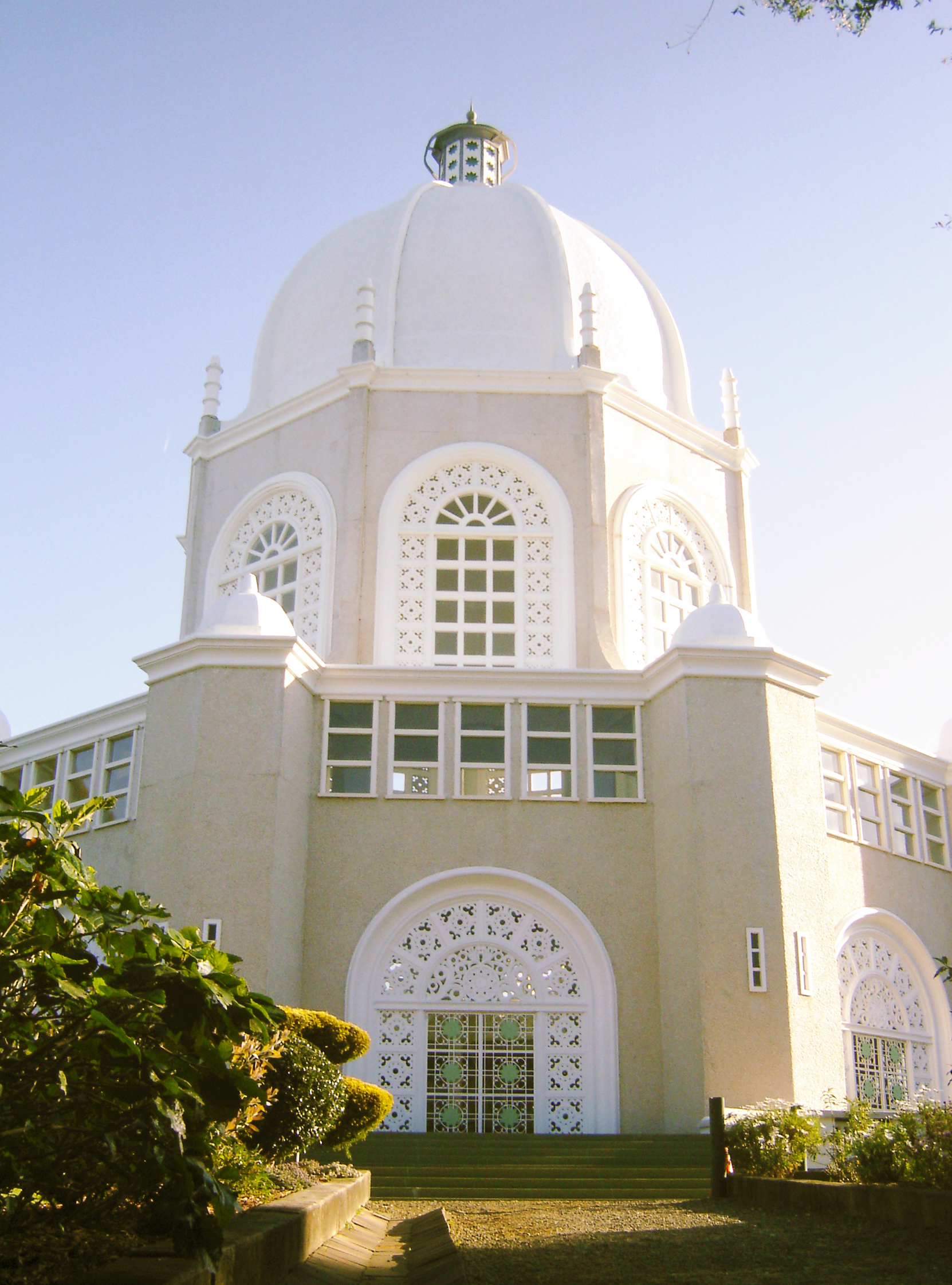
Baháʼí House of Worship in Ingleside, Sydney, Australia

The teachings of Baháʼu'lláh form the foundation of Baháʼí beliefs. Three principles are central to these teachings: the unity of God, the unity of religion, and the unity of humanity. Bahá'ís believe that God periodically reveals his will through divine messengers, whose purpose is to transform the character of humankind and to develop, within those who respond, moral and spiritual qualities. Religion is thus seen as orderly, unified, and progressive from age to age.

=== God ===
The Greatest Name is a calligraphic rendering of the Arabic text: يا بهاء الأبهى, translated as "O Thou Glory of Glories".

Baháʼí writings describe a single, personal, inaccessible, omniscient, omnipresent, imperishable, and almighty God who is the creator of all things in the universe. The existence of God and the universe are thought to be eternal, with no beginning or end. Even though God is not directly accessible, he is seen as being conscious of creation, with a will and a purpose which is expressed through messengers who are called Manifestations of God. The Baháʼí conception of God is of an "unknowable essence" who is the source of all existence and is known through the perception of divine qualities in creation and in the Manifestations of God. In another sense, Baháʼí teachings on God are also panentheistic, seeing signs of God in all things, but the reality of God being exalted and above the physical world.

Baháʼí teachings state that God is too great for humans to comprehend fully, and humans cannot create a complete and accurate image of God by themselves. Therefore, human understanding of God is achieved through the recognition of the person of the Manifestation and through the understanding of his revelations via his Manifestations. In the Baháʼí Faith, God is often referred to by titles and attributes (for example, the All-Powerful, or the All-Loving), and there is a substantial emphasis on monotheism. Baháʼí teachings state that these attributes do not apply to God directly but are used to translate Godliness into human terms and to help people focus on their own attributes in worshipping God, thereby developing their potential on their spiritual path. According to the Baháʼí teachings the human purpose is to learn to know and love God through such methods as prayer, reflection, and being of service to others.

=== Religion ===
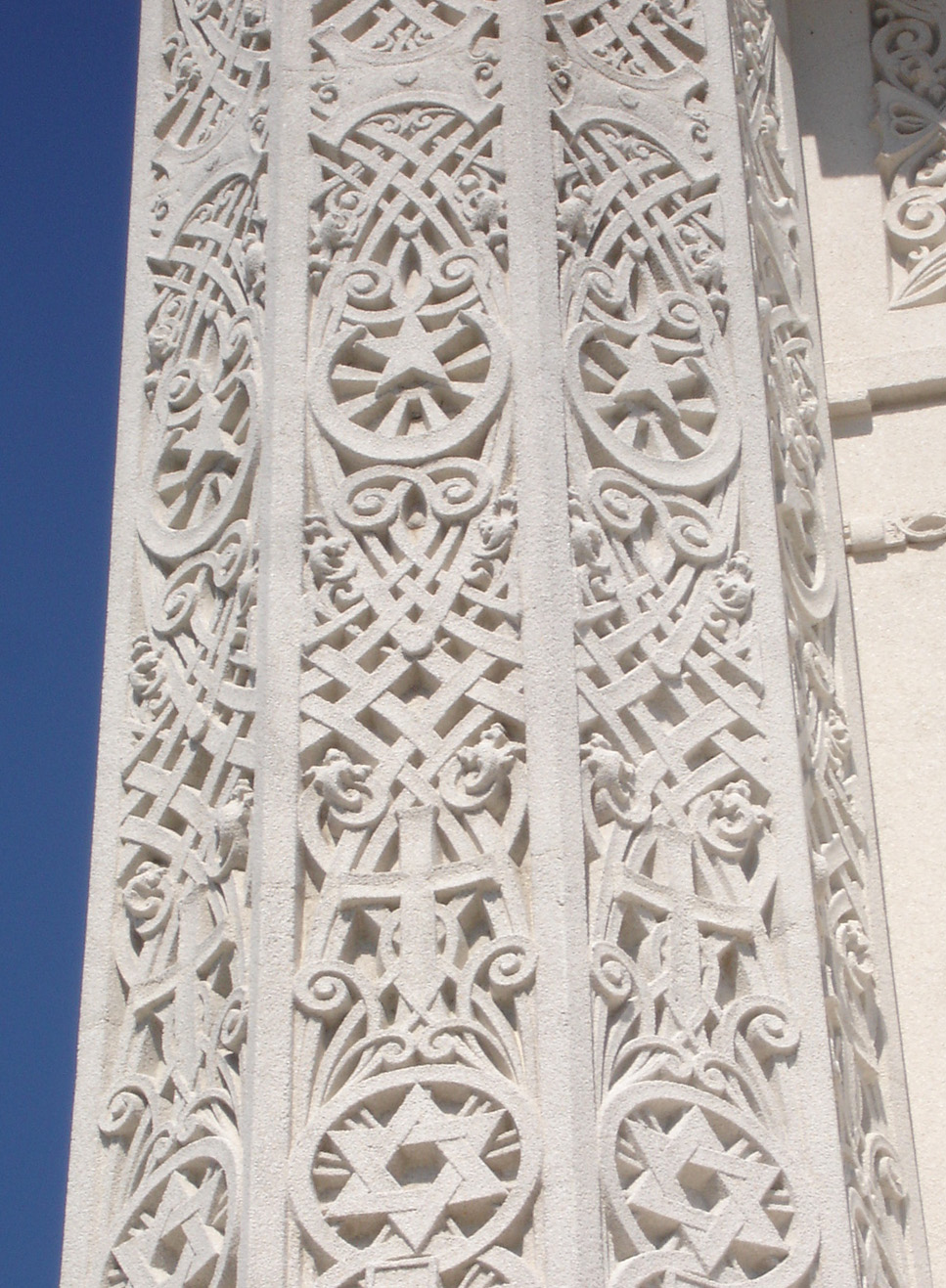
Symbols of many religions on a pillar of the Baháʼí House of Worship in Wilmette, Illinois, U.S.

Baháʼí notions of progressive religious revelation result in their accepting the validity of the well known religions of the world, whose founders and central figures are seen as Manifestations of God. Religious history is interpreted as a series of dispensations, where each manifestation brings a somewhat broader and more advanced revelation that is rendered as a text of scripture and passed on through history with greater or lesser reliability but at least true in substance, suited for the time and place in which it was expressed. Specific religious social teachings (for example, the direction of prayer, or dietary restrictions) may be revoked by a subsequent manifestation so that a more appropriate requirement for the time and place may be established. Conversely, certain general principles (for example, neighbourliness or charity) are seen to be universal and consistent. In Baháʼí belief, this process of progressive revelation will not end; it is, however, believed to be cyclical. Baháʼís do not expect a new manifestation of God to appear within 1000 years of Baháʼu'lláh's revelation.

Baháʼís assert that their religion is a distinct tradition with its own scriptures and laws, and not a sect of another religion. Most religious specialists now see it as an independent religion, with its religious background in Shiʻa Islam analogous to the Jewish context in which Christianity was established. Baháʼís describe their faith as an independent world religion, differing from the other traditions in its relative age and modern context.

The Baháʼí Faith has been described as belonging to the family of Abrahamic religions, as it is monotheistic and recognizes its own descent from the prophet Abraham.

=== Human beings ===
The ringstone symbol, representing humanity's connection to God

The Baháʼí writings state that human beings have a "rational soul," which provides the species with a unique capacity to recognize God's transcendence and humanity's relationship with its creator. Every human is seen to have a duty to recognize God through his Messengers, and to conform to their teachings. Through recognition and obedience, service to humanity and regular prayer and spiritual practice, the Baháʼí writings state that the soul becomes closer to God, the spiritual ideal in Baháʼí belief. According to Baháʼí belief, when a human dies, the soul is permanently separated from the body and carries on in the next world, where it is judged based on the person's actions in the physical world. Heaven and Hell are taught to be spiritual states of nearness or distance from God that describe relationships in this world and the next, and not physical places of reward and punishment achieved after death.

The Baháʼí writings emphasize the essential equality of human beings and the abolition of prejudice. Humanity is seen as essentially one, though highly varied; its diversity of race and culture is appreciated and accepted. Doctrines of racism, nationalism, caste, social class, and gender-based hierarchy are seen as artificial impediments to unity. The Baháʼí teachings state that the unification of humanity is the paramount issue in the religious and political conditions of the present world.

=== Social principles ===
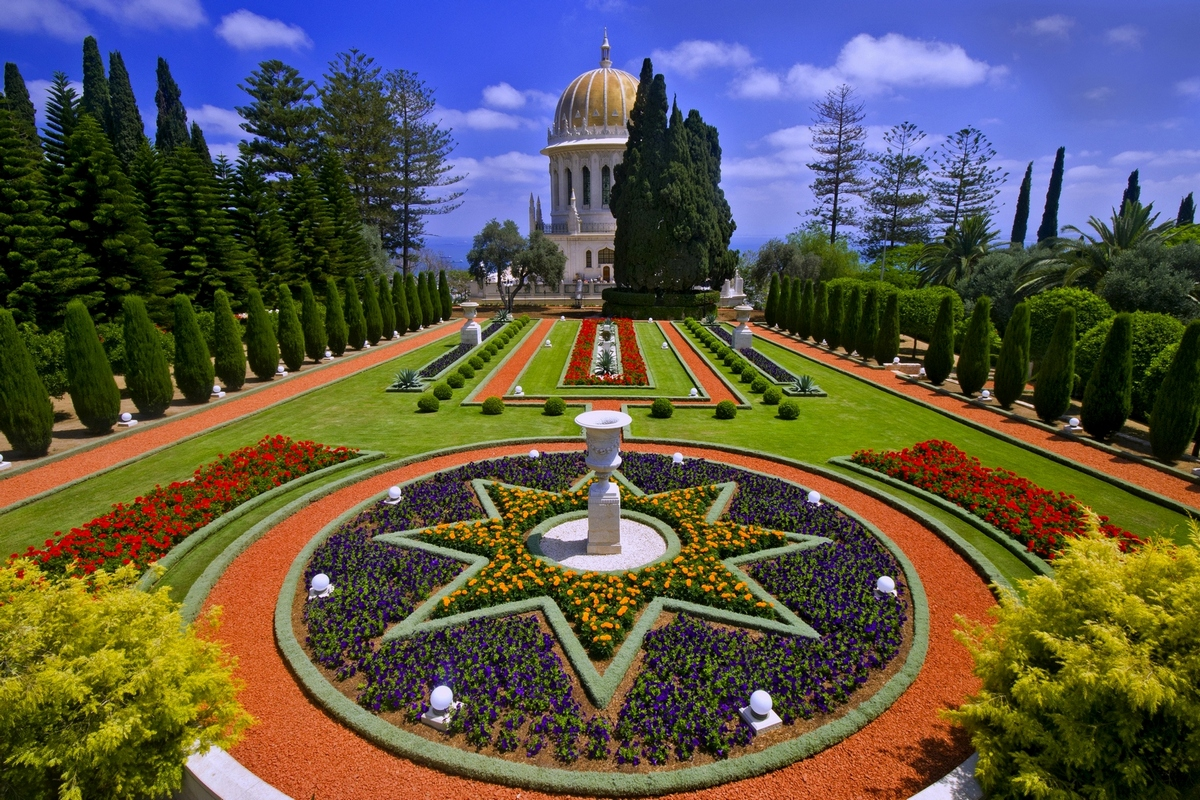
The Baháʼí gardens in Haifa, Israel

When ʻAbdu'l-Bahá first traveled to Europe and America in 1911–1912, he gave public talks that articulated the basic principles of the Baháʼí Faith. These included preaching on the equality of men and women, race unity, the need for world peace, and other ideas considered progressive in the early 20th century. Published summaries of the Baháʼí teachings often include a list of these principles, and lists vary in wording and what is included.

The concept of the unity of humankind, seen by Baháʼís as an ancient truth, is the starting point for many of the ideas. The equality of races and the elimination of extremes of wealth and poverty, for example, are implications of that unity. Another outgrowth of the concept is the need for a united world federation, and some practical recommendations to encourage its realization involve the establishment of a universal language, a standard economy and system of measurement, universal compulsory education, and an international court of arbitration to settle disputes between nations. Nationalism, according to this viewpoint, should be abandoned in favor of allegiance to the whole of humankind. In pursuit of world peace, Baháʼu'lláh prescribed a world-embracing collective security arrangement.

Other Baháʼí social principles revolve around spiritual unity. Religion is viewed as progressive from age to age, but to recognize a newer revelation, one has to abandon tradition and investigate independently. Baháʼís are taught to view religion as a source of unity and religious prejudice as destructive. Science is also viewed in harmony with true religion. Though Baháʼu'lláh and ʻAbdu'l-Bahá called for a united world that is free of war, they also anticipate that over the long term, the establishment of a lasting peace (The Most Great Peace) and the purging of the "overwhelming Corruptions" requires that the people of the world unite under a universal faith with spiritual virtues and ethics to complement material civilization.

Shoghi Effendi, the head of the religion from 1921 to 1957, wrote the following summary of what he considered to be the distinguishing principles of Baháʼu'lláh's teachings, which, he said, together with the laws and ordinances of the Kitáb-i-Aqdas constitute the bedrock of the Baháʼí Faith:

The independent search after truth, unfettered by superstition or tradition; the oneness of the entire human race, the pivotal principle and fundamental doctrine of the Faith; the basic unity of all religions; the condemnation of all forms of prejudice, whether religious, racial, class or national; the harmony which must exist between religion and science; the equality of men and women, the two wings on which the bird of human kind is able to soar; the introduction of compulsory education; the adoption of a universal auxiliary language; the abolition of the extremes of wealth and poverty; the institution of a world tribunal for the adjudication of disputes between nations; the exaltation of work, performed in the spirit of service, to the rank of worship; the glorification of justice as the ruling principle in human society, and of religion as a bulwark for the protection of all peoples and nations; and the establishment of a permanent and universal peace as the supreme goal of all mankind—these stand out as the essential elements [which Baháʼu'lláh proclaimed].

=== Covenant ===
Baháʼís highly value unity, and Baháʼu'lláh clearly established rules for holding the community together and resolving disagreements. Within this framework, no individual follower may propose 'inspired' or 'authoritative' interpretations of scripture, and individuals agree to support the line of authority established in Baháʼí scriptures. This practice has left the Baháʼí community unified and free of any serious fracturing. The Universal House of Justice is the final authority to resolve any disagreements among Baháʼís, and the few attempts at schism have all either become extinct or remained extremely small, numbering a few hundred adherents collectively. The followers of such divisions are regarded as Covenant-breakers and shunned.

== Sacred texts ==
The canonical texts of the Baháʼí Faith are the writings of the Báb, Baháʼu'lláh, ʻAbdu'l-Bahá, Shoghi Effendi and the Universal House of Justice, and the authenticated talks of ʻAbdu'l-Bahá. The writings of the Báb and Baháʼu'lláh are considered as divine revelation, the writings and talks of ʻAbdu'l-Bahá and the writings of Shoghi Effendi as authoritative interpretation, and those of the Universal House of Justice as authoritative legislation and elucidation. Some measure of divine guidance is assumed for all of these texts.

Some of Baháʼu'lláh's most important writings include the Kitáb-i-Aqdas ("Most Holy Book"), which defines many laws and practices for individuals and society, the Kitáb-i-Íqán ("Book of Certitude"), which became the foundation of much of Baháʼí belief, and Gems of Divine Mysteries, which includes further doctrinal foundations. Although the Baháʼí teachings have a strong emphasis on social and ethical issues, a number of foundational texts have been described as mystical. These include the Seven Valleys and the Four Valleys. The Seven Valleys was written to a follower of Sufism, in the style of ʻAttar, the Persian Muslim poet, and sets forth the stages of the soul's journey towards God. It was first translated into English in 1906, becoming one of the earliest available books of Baháʼu'lláh to the West. The Hidden Words is another book written by Baháʼu'lláh during the same period, containing 153 short passages in which Baháʼu'lláh claims to have taken the basic essence of certain spiritual truths and written them in brief form.

== Demographics ==
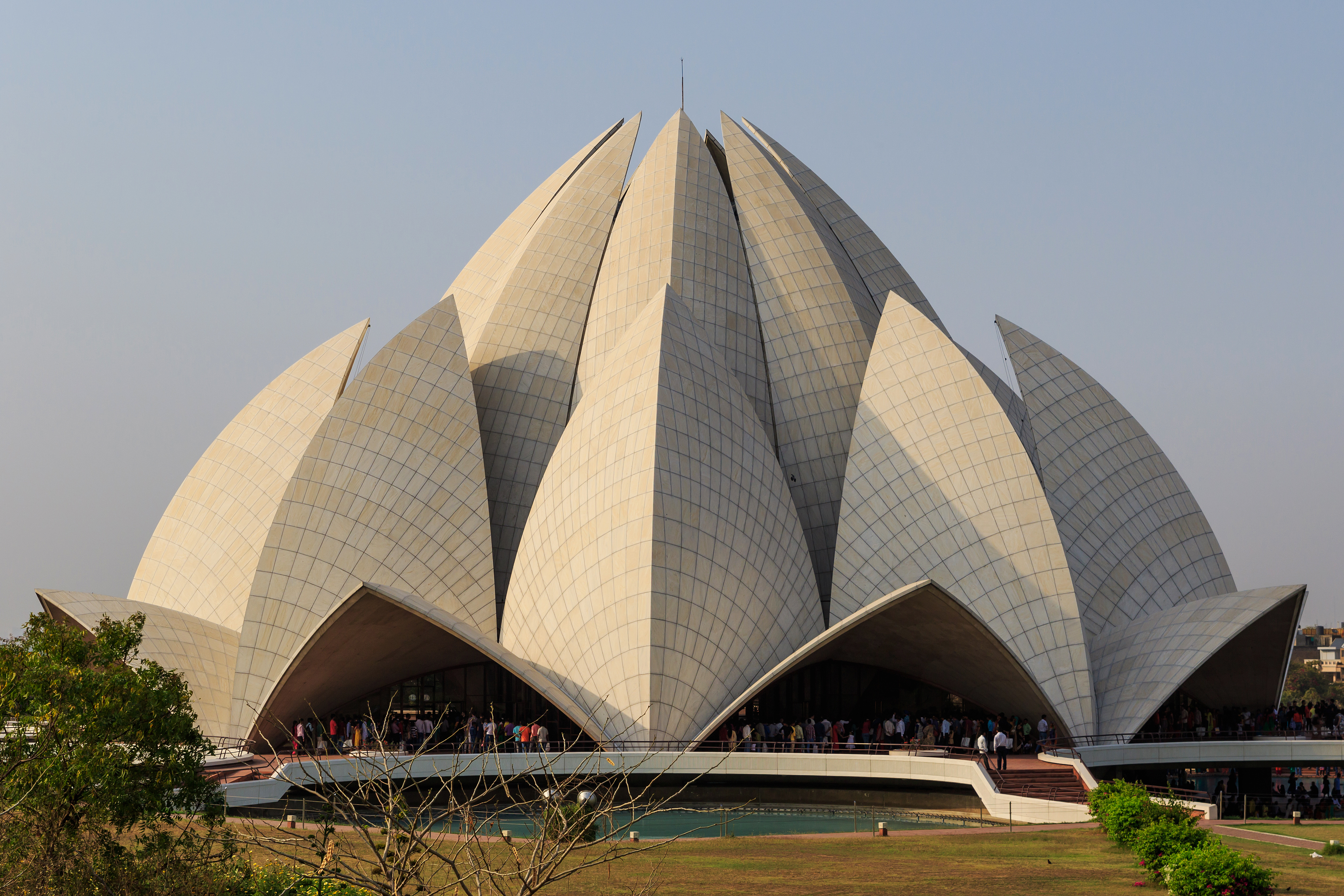
The Lotus Temple, the first Baháʼí House of Worship of India, built in 1986. It attracts an estimated 4.5 million visitors a year.

As of 2020, there were about 8 million Bahá'ís in the world. In 2013, two scholars of demography wrote that, "The Baha'i Faith is the only religion to have grown faster in every United Nations region over the past 100 years than the general population; Bahaʼi [sic] was thus the fastest-growing religion between 1910 and 2010, growing at least twice as fast as the population of almost every UN region."

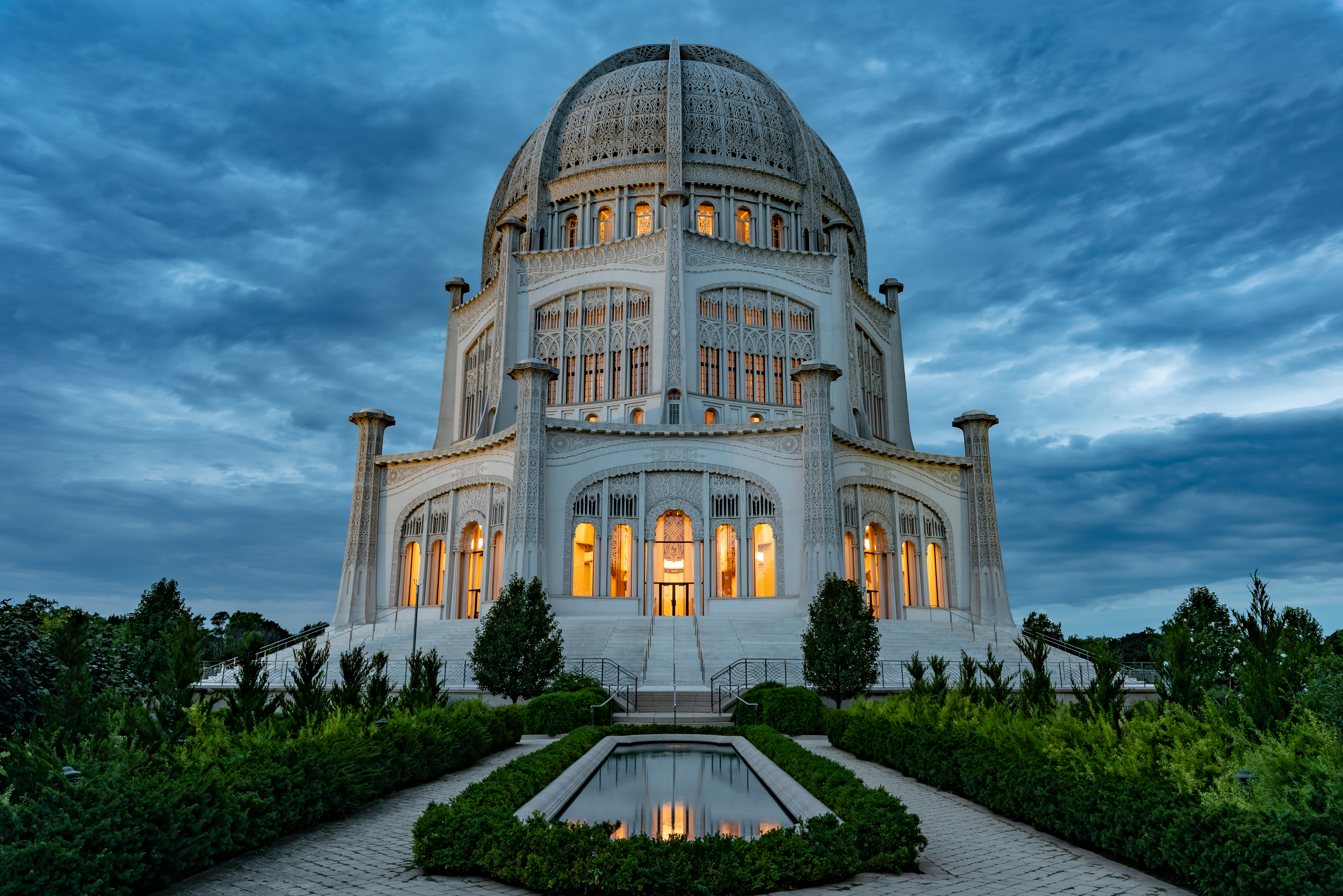
The Baháʼí House of Worship in Wilmette, Illinois, US is the oldest surviving Baháʼí House of Worship in the world.

The largest proportions of the total worldwide Bahá'í population were found in sub-Saharan Africa (29.9%) and South Asia (26.8%), followed by Southeast Asia (12.7%) and Latin America (12.2%). Lesser numbers are found in North America (7.6%) and the Middle East/North Africa (6.2%), with the smallest being in Europe (2.0%), Australasia (1.6%), and Northeast Asia (0.9%). In 2015, the Bahá'í Faith was the second largest religion in Iran, Panama, Belize, Bolivia, Zambia, and Papua New Guinea, and the third largest in Chad and Kenya.

From the Bahá'í Faith's origins in the 19th century until the 1950s, the vast majority of Baháʼís were found in Iran; converts from outside Iran were mostly found in India and the Western world. From roughly 200,000 adherents in 1950, the religion grew to over 4 million by the late 1980s, with a wide international distribution. As of 2008, there were about 110,000 followers in Iran. Most of the growth in the late 20th century was seeded out of North America by means of the planned migration of individuals. Yet, rather than being a cultural spread from either Iran or North America, in 2001, sociologist David B. Barrett wrote that the Baháʼí Faith is, "A world religion with no racial or national focus".

However, the growth has not been even. From the late 1920s to the late 1980s, the religion was banned and its adherents were harassed in the Soviet-led Eastern Bloc, and then again from the 1970s into the 1990s across some countries in sub-Saharan Africa. The most intense opposition has been in Iran and neighboring Shia-majority countries, considered an attempted genocide by some scholars, watchdog agencies and human rights organizations. Meanwhile, in other times and places, the religion has experienced surges in growth. Before it was banned in certain countries, the religion "hugely increased" in sub-Saharan Africa. In 1989 the Universal House of Justice named Bolivia, Bangladesh, Haiti, India, Liberia, Peru, the Philippines, and Taiwan as countries where the growth of the religion had been notable in the previous decades. Bahá'í sources claimed "more than five million" Bahá'ís in 1991–92. However, since around 2001 the Universal House of Justice has prioritized statistics of the community by their levels of activity rather than simply their population of avowed adherents or numbers of local assemblies.

Because Bahá'ís do not represent the majority of the population in any country, and most often represent only a tiny fraction of countries' total populations, there are problems of under-reporting. In addition, there are examples where the adherents have their highest density among minorities in societies who face their own challenges.

Malietoa Tanumafili II of Samoa, who became Baháʼí in 1968 and died in 2007, was the first serving head of state to embrace the Baháʼí Faith. Baháʼís consider Queen Marie of Romania to be the first crowned head to accept and promote the teachings of Baháʼu'lláh.

== Social practices ==
=== Exhortations ===
The following are a few examples from Baháʼu'lláh's teachings on personal conduct that are required or encouraged of his followers:

- Baháʼís over the age of 15 should individually recite an obligatory prayer each day, using fixed words and form.
- In addition to the daily obligatory prayer, Baháʼís should offer daily devotional prayer and should meditate and study sacred scripture.
- Adult Baháʼís should observe a Nineteen-Day Fast each year during daylight hours in March, with certain exemptions.
- There are specific requirements for Baháʼí burial that include a specified prayer to be read at the interment. Embalming or cremating the body is strongly discouraged.
- Baháʼís should make a 19% voluntary payment on any wealth in excess of what is necessary to live comfortably, after the remittance of any outstanding debt. The payments go to the Universal House of Justice.

=== Prohibitions ===
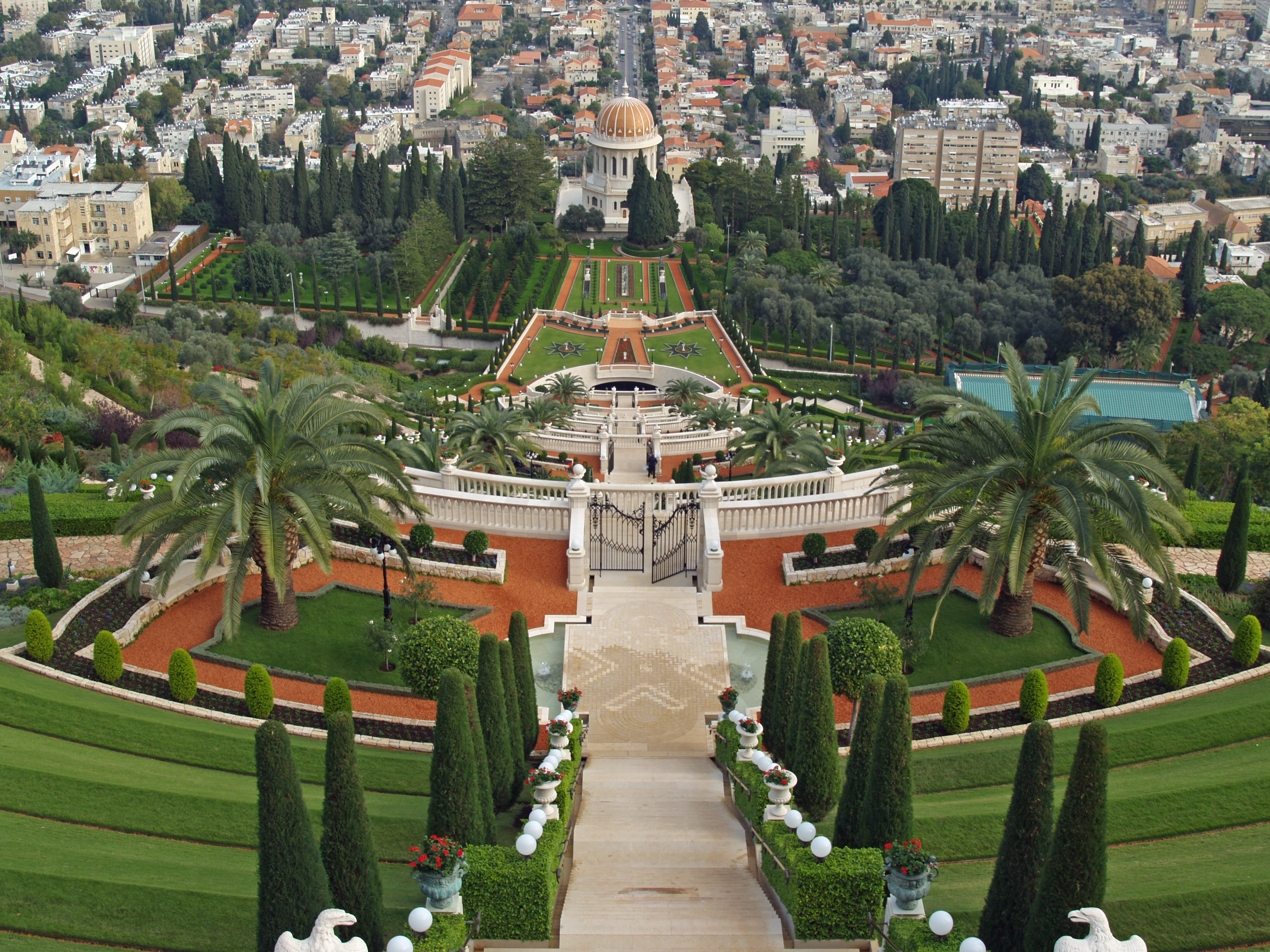
The Baháʼí gardens in Haifa, Israel

Personal conduct that are prohibited or discouraged by Baháʼu'lláh's teachings include:

- Backbiting and gossiping are prohibited and denounced.
- Drinking and selling alcohol are forbidden.
- Sexual intercourse is permitted only between a husband and a wife, and as a result, premarital, extramarital, and homosexual intercourse are all forbidden. (See also Homosexuality and the Baháʼí Faith)
- Participation in partisan politics is forbidden.
- Begging is forbidden as a profession.

The observance of personal laws, such as prayer or fasting, is the sole responsibility of the individual. There are, however, occasions when a Baháʼí might be administratively expelled from the community for a public disregard of the laws, or gross immorality. Such expulsions are administered by the National Spiritual Assembly and do not involve shunning.

While some of the laws in the Kitáb-i-Aqdas are applicable at the present time, other laws are dependent upon the existence of a predominantly Baháʼí society, such as the punishments for arson and murder. The laws, when not in direct conflict with the civil laws of the country of residence, are binding on every Baháʼí.

=== Marriage ===
The purpose of marriage in the Baháʼí Faith is mainly to foster spiritual harmony, fellowship and unity between a man and a woman and to provide a stable and loving environment for the rearing of children. The Baháʼí teachings on marriage call it a fortress for well-being and salvation and place marriage and the family as the foundation of the structure of human society. Baháʼu'lláh highly praised marriage, discouraged divorce, and required chastity outside marriage; Baháʼu'lláh taught that a husband and wife should strive to improve the spiritual life of each other. Interracial marriage is also highly praised throughout Baháʼí scripture.

Baháʼís intending to marry are asked to obtain a thorough understanding of the other's character before deciding to marry. Although parents should not choose partners for their children, once two individuals decide to marry, they must receive the consent of all living biological parents, whether they are Baháʼí or not. The Baháʼí marriage ceremony is simple; the only compulsory part of the wedding is the reading of the wedding vows prescribed by Baháʼu'lláh which both the groom and the bride read, in the presence of two witnesses. The vows are "We will all, verily, abide by the Will of God."

Transgender people who have completed medical and legal transition are recognized in the Baháʼí Faith as the new gender, including the possibility of marriage to the opposite gender.

=== Work ===
Baháʼu'lláh prohibited a mendicant and ascetic lifestyle. Monasticism is forbidden, and Baháʼís are taught to practice spirituality while engaging in useful work. The importance of self-exertion and service to humanity in one's spiritual life is emphasised further in Baháʼu'lláh's writings, where he states that work done in the spirit of service to humanity enjoys a rank equal to that of prayer and worship in the sight of God.

=== Places of worship ===
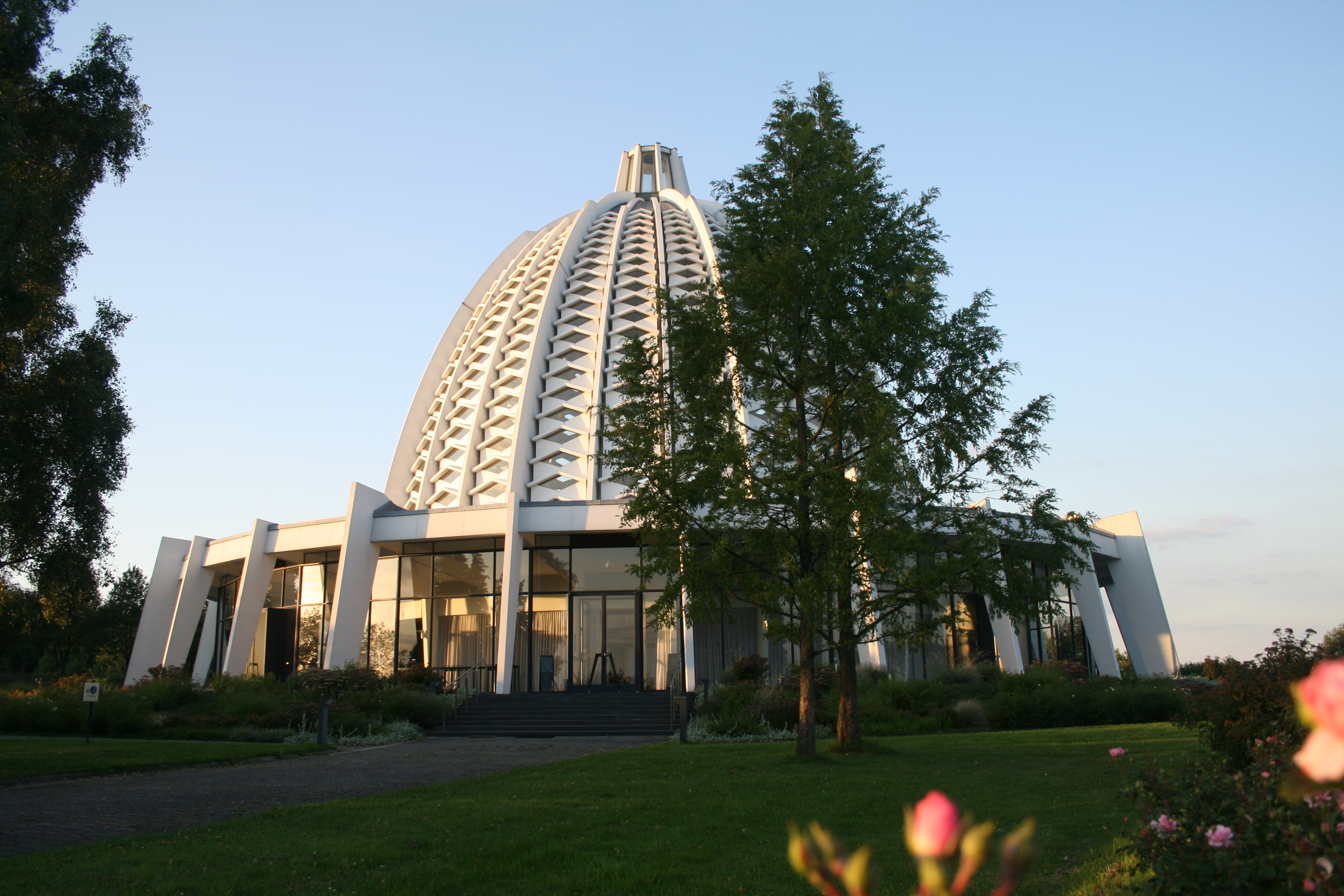
Baháʼí House of Worship, Langenhain, Germany

Bahá'í devotional meetings in most communities currently take place in people's homes or Bahá'í centres, but in some communities Bahá'í Houses of Worship (also known as Bahá'í temples) have been built. Bahá'í Houses of Worship are places where both Baháʼís and non-Baháʼís can express devotion to God. They are also known by the name Mashriqu'l-Adhkár (Arabic for "Dawning-place of the remembrance of God"). Only the holy scriptures of the Bahá'í Faith and other religions can be read or chanted inside, and while readings and prayers that have been set to music may be sung by choirs, no musical instruments may be played inside. Furthermore, no sermons may be delivered, and no ritualistic ceremonies practiced. All Bahá'í Houses of Worship have a nine-sided shape (nonagon) as well as nine pathways leading outward and nine gardens surrounding them. Eight continental, two national, and four local Baháʼí Houses of Worship have been built. The Bahá'í writings also envision Bahá'í Houses of Worship being surrounded by institutions for humanitarian, scientific, and educational pursuits, though none has yet been built up to such an extent.

=== Calendar ===
The Baháʼí calendar is based upon the calendar established by the Báb. The year consists of 19 months, each having 19 days, with four or five intercalary days, to make a full solar year. The Baháʼí New Year, called Naw Rúz, occurs on the vernal equinox, near 21 March (as does the traditional Iranian New Year) and at the end of the month of fasting. Once every Baháʼí month there is a gathering of the Baháʼí community called a Nineteen Day Feast with three parts: first, a devotional part for prayer and reading from Baháʼí scripture; second, an administrative part for consultation and community matters; and third, a social part for the community to interact freely.

Each of the 19 months is given a name which is an attribute of God; some examples include Baháʼ (Splendour), ʻIlm (Knowledge), and Jamál (Beauty). The Baháʼí week, like that in the Judeo-Christian and Islamic traditions, consists of seven days, with each day of the week also named after an attribute of God. Baháʼís observe 11 Holy Days throughout the year, with work suspended on 9 of these. These days commemorate important anniversaries in the history of the religion.

=== Symbols ===
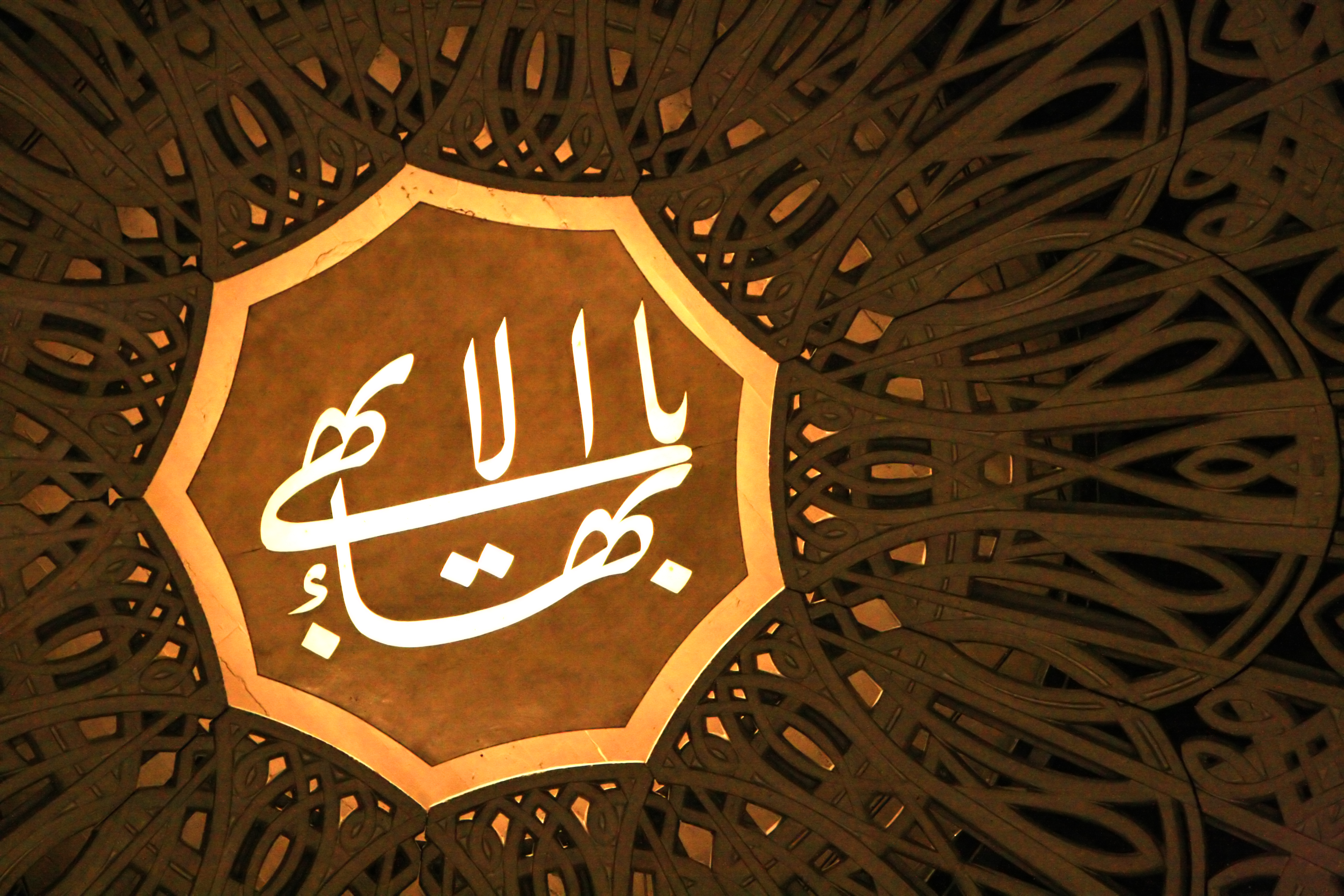
The calligraphy of the Greatest Name on a metal plate at the top of the interior of the Baháʼí House of Worship in Wilmette, Illinois

The symbols of the religion are derived from the Arabic word Baháʼ (بهاء "splendor" or "glory"), with a numerical value of nine. This numerical connection to the name of Baháʼu'lláh, as well as nine being the highest single-digit, symbolizing completeness, are why the most common symbol of the religion is a nine-pointed star, and Baháʼí temples are nine-sided. The nine-pointed star is commonly set on Baháʼí gravestones.

The ringstone symbol and calligraphy of the Greatest Name are also often encountered. The ringstone symbol consists of two five-pointed stars interspersed with a stylized Baháʼ whose shape is meant to recall God, the Manifestation of God, and the world of man; the Greatest Name is a calligraphic rendering of the phrase Yá Baháʼu'l-Abhá (يا بهاء الأبهى "O Glory of the Most Glorious!") and is commonly found in Baháʼí temples and homes.

=== Socio-economic development ===
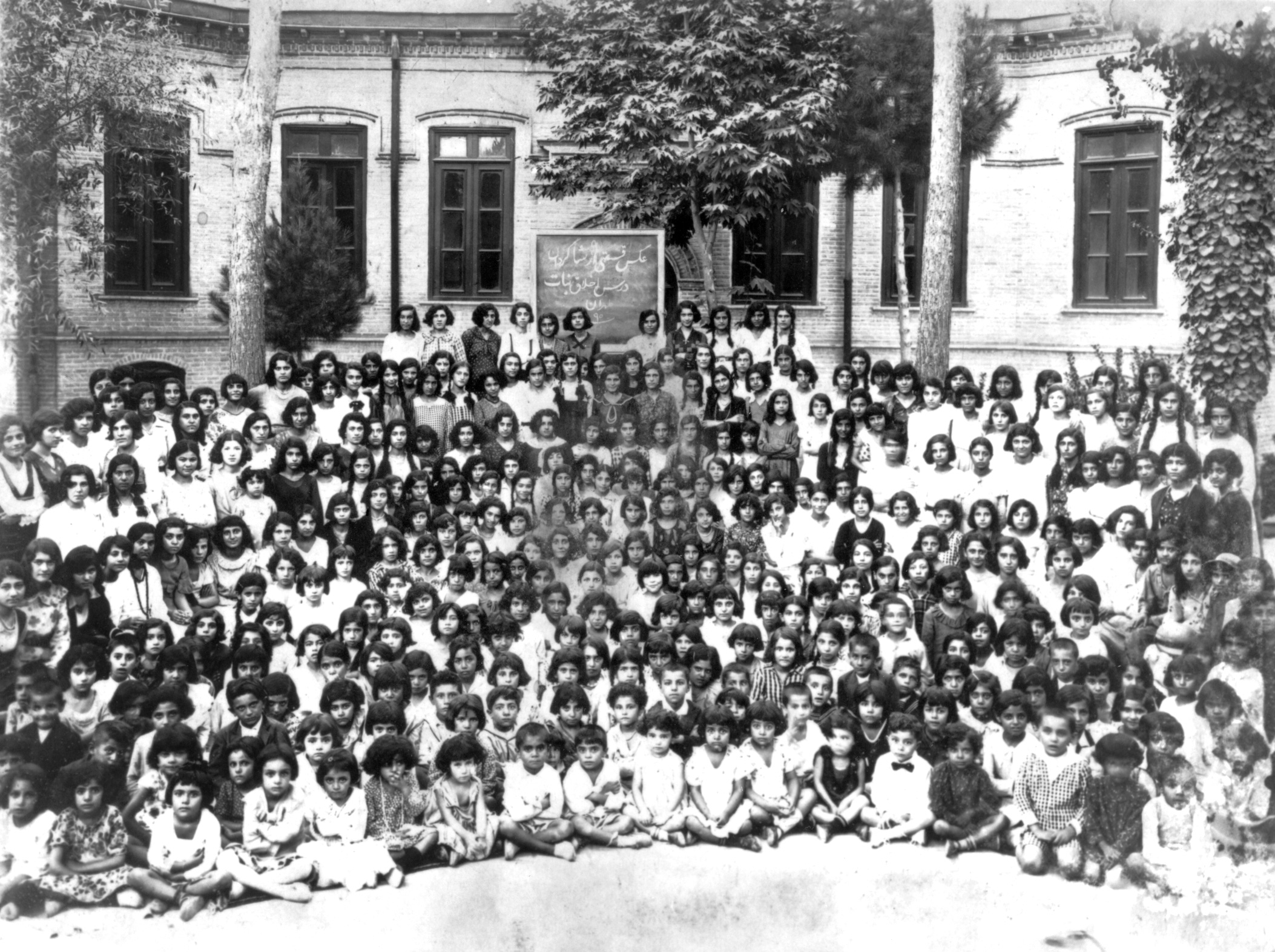
Students of School for Girls, Tehran, 13 August 1933. This photograph may be of the students of Tarbiyat School for Girls which was established by the Baháʼí Community of Tehran in 1911; the school was closed by government decree in 1934.

Since its inception the Baháʼí Faith has had involvement in socio-economic development beginning by giving greater freedom to women, promulgating the promotion of female education as a priority concern, and that involvement was given practical expression by creating schools, agricultural co-ops, and clinics.

The religion entered a new phase of activity when a message from the Universal House of Justice dated 20 October 1983 was released. Baháʼís were urged to seek out ways, compatible with the Baháʼí teachings, in which they could become involved in the social and economic development of the communities in which they lived. Worldwide in 1979 129 Baháʼí-inspired socio-economic development projects were identified. By 1987, the number of development projects had increased to 1,482.

Current initiatives of social action include activities in areas like health, sanitation, education, gender equality, arts and media, agriculture, and the environment. Educational projects range from village tutorial schools to large secondary schools, and some universities. By 2017, the Baháʼí Office of Social and Economic Development estimated that there were 40,000 small-scale projects, 1,400 projects with long-term sustained activity, and 135 Baháʼí-inspired organizations.

=== United Nations ===
Baháʼu'lláh wrote of the need for world government in this age of humanity's collective life. Because of this emphasis the international Baháʼí community has chosen to support efforts of improving international relations through organizations such as the League of Nations and the United Nations, with some reservations about the present structure and constitution of the UN.

The Baháʼí International Community (BIC), which represents Baháʼí communities at the international level, has been registered as a nongovernmental organization with the United Nations since 1948. It has held Special Consultative Status with the United Nations Economic and Social Council (ECOSOC) since 1970. The BIC also has consultative status with UNICEF and accreditation with the United Nations Environment Programme and the United Nations Department of Public Information.

The Baháʼí International Community has offices at the United Nations in New York and Geneva and representations to United Nations regional commissions and other offices in Addis Ababa, Bangkok, Nairobi, Rome, Santiago, and Vienna. In recent years, an Office of the Environment and an Office for the Advancement of Women were established as part of its United Nations Office. The Baháʼí Faith has also undertaken joint development programs with various other United Nations agencies. In the 2000 Millennium Forum of the United Nations a Baháʼí was invited as one of the few non-governmental speakers during the summit.

== Persecution ==
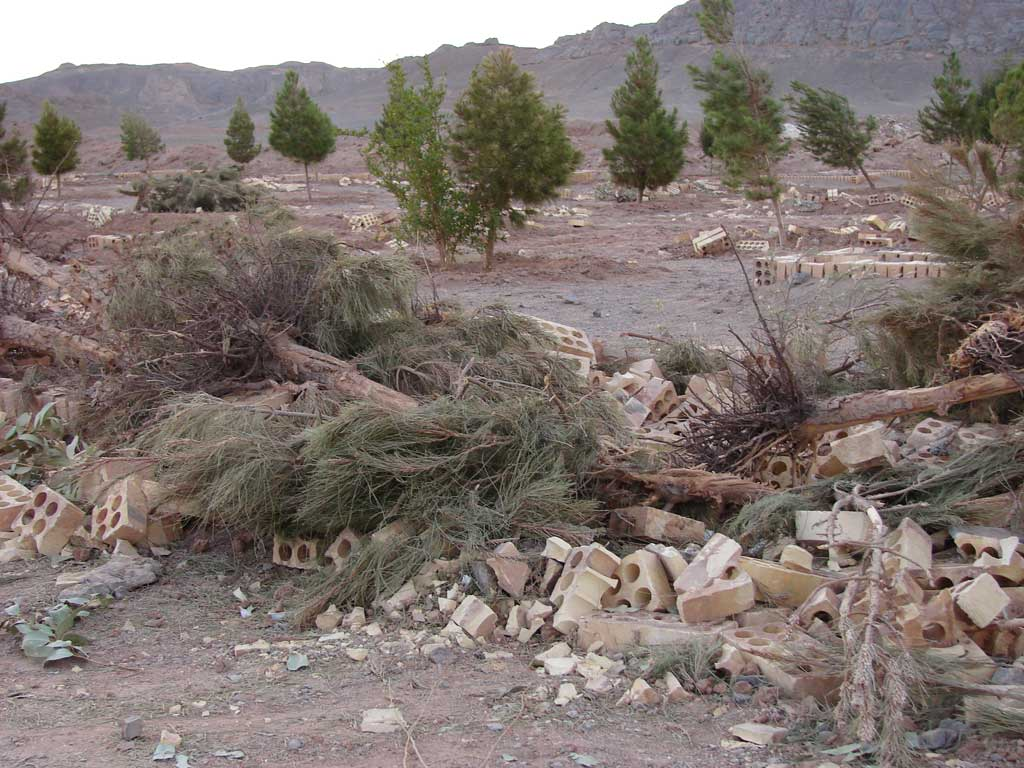
The Baháʼí cemetery in Yazd after its desecration by the Iranian government in 2007

Baháʼís continue to be persecuted in some majority-Islamic countries, whose leaders do not recognize the Baháʼí Faith as an independent religion, but rather as apostasy from Islam. The most severe persecutions have occurred in Iran, where more than 200 Baháʼís were executed between 1978 and 1998. The rights of Baháʼís have been restricted to greater or lesser extents in numerous other countries, including Egypt, Afghanistan, Indonesia, Iraq, Morocco, Yemen, and several countries in sub-Saharan Africa.

=== Iran ===
The most enduring persecution of Baháʼís has been in Iran, the birthplace of the religion. When the Báb started attracting a large following, the clergy hoped to stop the movement from spreading by stating that its followers were enemies of God. These clerical directives led to mob attacks and public executions. Starting in the twentieth century, in addition to repression aimed at individual Baháʼís, centrally directed campaigns that targeted the entire Baháʼí community and its institutions were initiated. In one case in Yazd in 1903 more than 100 Baháʼís were killed. Baháʼí schools, such as the Tarbiyat boys' and girls' schools in Tehran, were closed in the 1930s and 1940s, Baháʼí marriages were not recognized and Baháʼí texts were censored.

During the reign of Mohammad Reza Pahlavi, to divert attention from economic difficulties in Iran and from a growing nationalist movement, a campaign of persecution against the Baháʼís was instituted. (Note: In line with this is the thinking that the government encouraged the campaign to distract attention from more serious problems, including acute economic difficulties. Beyond this lay the difficulty that the regime faced in harnessing the nationalist movement that had supported Musaddiq.) An approved and coordinated anti-Baháʼí campaign (to incite public passion against the Baháʼís) started in 1955 and it included the spreading of anti-Baháʼí propaganda on national radio stations and in official newspapers. During that campaign, initiated by Mulla Muhammad Taghi Falsafi, the Bahá'í center in Tehran was demolished at the orders of Tehran military governor, General Teymur Bakhtiar. In the late 1970s the Shah's regime consistently lost legitimacy due to criticism that it was pro-Western. As the anti-Shah movement gained ground and support, revolutionary propaganda was spread which alleged that some of the Shah's advisors were Baháʼís. Baháʼís were portrayed as economic threats, and as supporters of Israel and the West, and societal hostility against the Baháʼís increased.

Since the Islamic Revolution of 1979, Iranian Baháʼís have regularly had their homes ransacked or have been banned from attending university or from holding government jobs, and several hundred have received prison sentences for their religious beliefs, most recently for participating in study circles. Baháʼí cemeteries have been desecrated and property has been seized and occasionally demolished, including the House of Mírzá Buzurg, Baháʼu'lláh's father. The House of the Báb in Shiraz, one of three sites to which Baháʼís perform pilgrimage, has been destroyed twice. In May 2018, the Iranian authorities expelled a young woman student from university of Isfahan because she was Baháʼí. In March 2018, two more Baháʼí students were expelled from universities in the cities of Zanjan and Gilan because of their religion.

According to a US panel, attacks on Baháʼís in Iran increased under Mahmoud Ahmadinejad's presidency. The United Nations Commission on Human Rights revealed an October 2005 confidential letter from Command Headquarters of the Armed Forces of Iran ordering its members to identify Baháʼís and to monitor their activities. Due to these actions, the Special Rapporteur of the United Nations Commission on Human Rights stated on 20 March 2006, that she "also expresses concern that the information gained as a result of such monitoring will be used as a basis for the increased persecution of, and discrimination against, members of the Baháʼí faith, in violation of international standards. The Special Rapporteur is concerned that this latest development indicates that the situation with regard to religious minorities in Iran is, in fact, deteriorating."

On 14 May 2008, members of an informal body known as the "Friends" that oversaw the needs of the Baháʼí community in Iran were arrested and taken to Evin prison. The Friends court case has been postponed several times, but was finally underway on 12 January 2010. Other observers were not allowed in the court. Even the defense lawyers, who for two years have had minimal access to the defendants, had difficulty entering the courtroom. The chairman of the U.S. Commission on International Religious Freedom said that it seems that the government has already predetermined the outcome of the case and is violating international human rights law. Further sessions were held on 7 February 2010, 12 April 2010 and 12 June 2010. On 11 August 2010 it became known that the court sentence was 20 years imprisonment for each of the seven prisoners which was later reduced to ten years. After the sentence, they were transferred to Gohardasht prison. In March 2011 the sentences were reinstated to the original 20 years. On 3 January 2010, Iranian authorities detained ten more members of the Baha'i minority, reportedly including Leva Khanjani, granddaughter of Jamaloddin Khanjani, one of seven Baha'i leaders jailed since 2008 and in February, they arrested his son, Niki Khanjani.

The Iranian government claims that the Baháʼí Faith is not a religion, but is instead a political organization, and hence refuses to recognize it as a minority religion. However, the government has never produced convincing evidence supporting its characterization of the Baháʼí community. The Iranian government also accuses the Baháʼí Faith of being associated with Zionism. (Note: A spokesman for the Iranian Embassy in Argentina explained that the exclusion was prompted by the fact that the Bahá’ís were a "misguided group… whose affiliation and association with world Zionism is a clear fact" and who could not be "in the same category as minorities like the Christian, Jews and Zoroastrians.") These accusations against the Baháʼís appear to lack basis in historical fact, (Note: The Iranian leader Naser al-Din Shah Qajar banished Baháʼu'lláh from Iran to the Ottoman Empire, from where he was later exiled by the Ottoman Sultan, at the behest of the Iranian Shah to territories further from Iran and finally to Akka, which only a century later was incorporated into the state of Israel.) with some arguing they were invented by the Iranian government in order to use the Baháʼís as scapegoats.

In 2019, the Iranian government made it impossible for the Baháʼís to legally register with the Iranian state. National identity card applications in Iran no longer include the "other religions" option, effectively making access to official government services unavailable to Bahá'ís.

In 2024, Human Rights Watch concluded that the Iranian government's decades-long systematic repression of Baháʼís amounted to the crime against humanity of persecution. The organization documented arbitrary arrests and prosecutions, restrictions on education and employment, confiscation of property, and interference with Baháʼí burials as part of a pattern of state policy targeting adherents because of their religion.

=== Egypt ===
During the 1920s, Egypt's religious Tribunal recognized the Baha'i Faith as a new religion, independent from Islam, due to the nature of the 'laws, principles and beliefs' of the Baha'is.

Baháʼí institutions and community activities have been illegal under Egyptian law since 1960. All Baháʼí community properties, including Baháʼí centers, libraries, and cemeteries, have been confiscated by the government and fatwas have been issued charging Baháʼís with apostasy.

The Egyptian identification card controversy began in the 1990s when the government modernized the electronic processing of identity documents, which introduced a de facto requirement that documents must list the person's religion as Muslim, Christian, or Jewish (the only three religions officially recognized by the government). Consequently, Baháʼís were unable to obtain government identification documents (such as national identification cards, birth certificates, death certificates, marriage or divorce certificates, or passports) necessary to exercise their rights in their country unless they lied about their religion, which conflicts with Baháʼí religious principle. Without documents, they could not be employed, educated, treated in hospitals, travel outside of the country, or vote, among other hardships. Following a protracted legal process culminating in a court ruling favorable to the Baháʼís, the interior minister of Egypt released a decree on 14 April 2009, amending the law to allow Egyptians who are not Muslim, Christian, or Jewish to obtain identification documents that list a dash in place of one of the three recognized religions. The first identification cards were issued to two Baháʼís under the new decree on 8 August 2009.

=== Yemen ===
Baháʼís in Yemen have faced persecution by the Houthi authorities. On 25 May 2023, Houthi forces raided a peaceful Baháʼí gathering at a private residence in Sanaa and detained 17 people, including five women. The detainees were initially forcibly disappeared, and several remained in detention a year later. In 2025, the United Nations Panel of Experts on Yemen reported that the Houthis had systematically discriminated against the Baháʼí community and documented restrictions on freedom of religion, expression, conscience and belief, as well as coerced pledges, property confiscation and continuing restrictions imposed on former detainees.

=== Ottoman Empire ===
The Bahá'ís arrived in Acre, Palestine, in the 19th century, fleeing persecution. Ottoman authorities viewed Bahá'u'lláh as politically dangerous, which led to his exile to various locations within the Ottoman Empire, including Constantinople (Istanbul) and Adrianople (Edirne). After several exiles, Bahá'u'lláh finally arrived in Acre, where he lived under house arrest until his death in 1892. His followers later established the Bahá'í Gardens and shrines in Haifa and Acre, both of which are now UNESCO World Heritage sites.

== See also ==
- Baháʼí administration
- Baháʼí–Azali split
- Baháʼí cosmology
- Baháʼí Faith and gender equality
- Baháʼí Faith in fiction
- Baháʼí studies
- Baháʼí timeline
- Progressive revelation (Baháʼí)
- Baháʼí views on science
- Baháʼí World Centre buildings
- Criticism of the Baháʼí Faith
- Huqúqu'lláh
- List of Baháʼís
- List of writings of Baháʼu'lláh
- Outline of the Baháʼí Faith
- Terraces (Baháʼí)
- World Religion Day
