= Writings of Baháʼu'lláh =

The writings of Baháʼu'lláh are the corpus of texts written or narrated by Baháʼu'lláh, which are regarded as sacred scripture in the Baháʼí Faith. Baháʼu'lláh was the founder of the Baháʼí Faith; he was born in Persia and later exiled for being a follower of the Báb, who in 1844 had declared himself to be a Manifestation of God and forerunner of "Him Whom God shall make manifest". Baháʼu'lláh first announced his claim to be a Manifestation of God in 1863 and spent the rest of his life as a prisoner of the Ottoman Empire, exiled first to Baghdad, followed by Istanbul, Edirne, where he began proclaiming his mission, and finally Acre. His teachings revolve around the principles of unity and religious renewal, ranging from moral and spiritual progress to world governance.

== Overview ==
Baháʼu'lláh's writings, also referred to as Tablets, were written over a forty-year period beginning before he declared his mission in 1863. Almost 20,000 separate works with a total of around seven million words are currently catalogued at the Baháʼí World Centre in Haifa, Israel, a majority of which are preserved authenticated copies. His writings constitute a vast body of work, of which approximately two-thirds is in Arabic and the remainder is either in Persian or a mixture of both Arabic and Persian passages. They include treatises; correspondence with individuals; comments on passages from the Bible, the Qur’an, Islamic Hadith, Sufi poets, historians and philosophers; and many thousands of prayers, some of which are stand-alone tablets and others of which are part of larger tablets. The majority of his writings were dictated to Mírzá Áqá Ján, his amanuensis; eyewitnesses described the experience of witnessing the revelation of Baháʼu'lláh's words as overwhelming and said Baháʼu'lláh spoke so rapidly that Mírzá Áqá Ján sometimes had difficulty keeping up. Sometimes Baháʼu'lláh uttered over 1000 verses in less than an hour without any apparent forethought, and on occasion during the early years this continued over extended periods lasting day and night, often involving visionary experiences. In order to copy down everything that Baháʼu'lláh said at these times, Mírzá Áqá Ján developed his own style of speed writing. After, a clear version was prepared, forming the basis of a formal copy to be given to the recipient. When texts were assigned to individuals in Persia they were often sent to a copyist linked together on one document, and then re-copied as separate items. The abundance of hand copied texts undoubtedly accounts for the fact that Baháʼu'lláh's writings, either in the original or in trusted transcriptions, have survived for posterity.

=== Content ===
The underlying theme running through Baháʼu'lláh's writings is the precept of unity in diversity: one God at the root of various concepts of a deity, unity of the prophets in spite of apparent differences in their messages, unity of religion despite seemingly contradictory beliefs, and unity of humanity which has forever suffered and continues to suffer conflicts between tribes, religious factions, and nations.

The majority of Baháʼu'lláh's writings consist of comparatively short replies to correspondence from his followers, who, during the early period of his ministry, lived primarily within Shi’ite Islamic boundaries. As news began to spread of the Baháʼí movement, and as a result of Baháʼu'lláh's several exiles, — which included Baghdad in Iraq before he was moved to Istanbul, Edirne, and finally the prison city of Acre in Palestine, — correspondence widened to include members of minority Islamic and mystical groups, Jews, Zoroastrians and Christians, including Pope Pius IX, several crowned heads of Europe, as well as correspondents in Central Asia and India, religious and secular rulers of the Persian and Ottoman empires, and the various state leaders of North America.

=== History ===
One of Baháʼu'lláh's first known Tablets dates from 1852, at the time of his imprisonment in the Síyáh-Chál in Tehran following false accusations against him in connection with the failed assassination attempt on the life of the Shah. Bearing the title Rashḥ-i-‘Amá [The Clouds of the Realms Above], it is a poem of 20 verses written in Persian, and is among the few that he wrote before being exiled from Persia to Baghdad.

Baháʼu'lláh was first exiled in 1853 to Baghdad, accompanied by his family and close companions. Following the attempted assassination of the Shah, Baháʼu'lláh's half brother, Azal Mírzá Yahyá, had fled into the mountains and forests of northern Persia in fear for his life, later disguising himself and joining Baháʼu'lláh in Baghdad.

Baháʼu'lláh's writings from that time onwards can be divided into three periods. Shoghi Effendi referred to these periods as the Vernal years, covering the exile to Baghdad; Summertime, being the exiles in Istanbul and Edirne; and the Harvest Season, which covers Baháʼu'lláh's exile in Acre. Baháʼu'lláh's writings also fall into three categories: the first following on from the proclamation of his mission in Edirne; the second including laws and ordinances, most of which were already listed in the Kitáb-i-Aqdas ("The Most Holy Book"); and the third comprising writings which affirm or reaffirm the basic beliefs and principles of his faith.

== 1853–1863, Baghdad ==
Baháʼu'lláh's arrival in Baghdad in early April 1853 marked a turning point for the Bábí movement, which to all intents and purposes had collapsed into near obscurity, and for his outgoing and authoritative personality Bahá’u’lláh was soon recognised by the Bábís as being a religious leader in his own right. Baháʼu'lláh's texts during his first year of exile in Baghdad, two of which are mentioned below, included the promotion of the Cause of the Báb, enigmatic references to his own prophetic claim, and acknowledgment of Azal, his half brother, as nominal head of the Bábí community. Texts from this period include:

- Khutbiy-i-Salavat [‘Sermon of Salutations’], acclaims the Cause of the Báb, exhorting his followers to look for and direct their gaze towards the ‘countenance of light’.
- Lawh-i-Kullu't-Ta'ám [Tablet of All Food], a symbolic Arabic commentary on the Qur'anic verse "All food was allowed to the children of Israel" [Qur’an 3:93]

Finding the Bábí community in Iraq in disarray, Baháʼu'lláh began encouraging and reuniting the believers, his popularity and the respect he received causing mounting tension and disunity due to Azal's resentment, manifested in the spreading of rumours concerning Baháʼu'lláh's character and motives. And so, on 10 April 1854 Baháʼu'lláh departed Baghdad for Sulaymaniyah, in the mountains of Kurdistan, his reason being "to avoid becoming a subject of discord among the faithful, a source of disturbance unto Our companions, the means of injury to any soul, or the cause of sorrow to any heart." During Baháʼu'lláh's two year withdrawal to Sulaymaniya he became aware of the nature of his mission, which he expressed through poems, prayers and meditations, a few of which survived, including:

- Qaṣídiy-i-Izz-i-Varqá’íyyih [Ode of the Dove], a symbolic representation of Bahá’u’lláh's internal reflection as He communes with the Holy Spirit dwelling within Him and which speaks through Him.
- Sáqí az Ghayb-i Baqá [The Cupbearer from the Eternal Unseen], a brief ode touching on his messianic secret, asking for purity of heart and dedication to love and sacrifice as the prerequisite for the spiritual journey.
- Baz Av-u-Bidih Jamih [At dawn the Friend came to my bed], a short ode focused on celebration of divine love and appealing for immortal life offered in service to God.

On returning from the mountains of Kurdistan in 1856 Baháʼu'lláh set to work on reuniting the dispirited and divided Bábí community, his writings focused on offering the Bábís a deeper understanding of their new religion, in the process appealing to a growing number of devoted disciples. Key to Baháʼu'lláh's revival of the Bábí community and his position as leader were his writings, His diverse style including obscure language as used by many of the Bábís, clear and assertive religious poetry, and direct, coherent prose. A considerable number of his writings consisted of letters addressed to individuals which were guaranteed a wide distribution by copyists. Whilst much of his output clarified new elements in regard to Bábí tradition, a major theme during this period was Baháʼu'lláh's awareness of the divine presence, the significance of which he had first become aware during his four months of imprisonment in the Síyáh-Chál in Tehran. Of particular note in these writings is the Bábí-Baháʼí understanding of God's messengers, referred to as the Manifestations of God, Baháʼu'lláh stressing their underlying unity and the continuity of divine revelation. A number of Baháʼu'lláh's writings from this period demonstrate a knowledge of sections of the Bible which, in conjunction with his defence of Jews and Christians from a Muslim assertion that they had falsely altered Muslim scriptures, were extremely uncommon in nineteenth-century Muslim writing. Writings from this period include:

- Kalimat-i Maknunih (Hidden Words), unlike the majority of Baháʼu'lláh's works, this was not addressed to a specific person. It consists of two collections, one in Arabic, one in Persian, of mystical and ethical aphorisms. which Baháʼu'lláh declared had descended from the divine world, completing the revelations of God's previous messengers.
- Haft Vádi (The Seven Valleys), written for Shaykh Muhiyu’d-din, the Qadi (leader) of the Khaniqayn Sufi Order, Haft Vádi follows the structure of The Conference of the Birds, the classic Sufi text by Faridu’d-din Attar, and describes seven stages along the path towards spiritual enlightenment.
- Kitab-i-Iqan [The Book of Certitude] Written in response to questions by one of the Báb's maternal uncles, Hájí Mírzá Sayyid Muhammad, a Biblical and Qur’anic interpretation outlining the Baháʼí concept of progressive revelation through a succession of Manifestations.
- Aṣl-i-Kullu'l-K͟hayr (Words of Wisdom), a collection of moral aphorisms including the essence of faith, wisdom, religion, love and wealth, centred on belief in God and submission to him.
- Chahár-Vádi (The Four Valleys), addressed to the leader of the Kurdish Qádiri Sufis, Shaykh ‘Abdu’r-Rahmán Tábabáni of Kirkuk, a mystical treatise describing four paths to God, being the self, reason, love and the heart.
- Hurúfát-i-'Álín [The Exalted Letters], reflections on death and the human soul.
- Javáhiru’l-Asrár (Gems of Divine Mysteries), written in response to questions from Siyyid Yusuf-i-Sidihi Isfahani, a leader of the Shi’as in Najaf, addressing the question of how the Promised One of Islam, the Báb, could materialize as an ordinary human being, and interpreting Qur’anic beliefs such as the Resurrection and Day of Judgment.
- Lawh-i-Maryam [Tablet to Maryam], addressed to one of Bahá’u’lláh’s cousins to whom he describes events including his exile to Baghdad, withdrawal to Sulaymaniyah, and his efforts to rejuvenate the disheartened Bábí community on His return. He also touches on the as yet unrevealed nature of his station, recognition of which depends on purity of heart, and announces his withdrawal from the community.
- Madínatu’r-Ridá[The City of Contentment], explaining contentment - with God and His decree, with one’s self, with fellow believers and with trials and tribulations in the world.
- Madinatu’t-Tawhid [The City of Unity], addressed to Shaykh Salman, who for 40 years carried messages from Baháʼu'lláh to his believers in Persia, this tablet forms a theological discussion on the concept of divine unity from various perspectives.
- Ṣaḥífiy-i-Shaṭṭíyyih [Book of the River], focusing on the power and sovereignty of the Cause of God and comparing its progress with the movement of the river Tigris.
- Súriy-i-Nush [Surah of Counsel], describing the rejection of God’s previous prophets by the people and clergy at the time whilst urging the people of today not to reject “Him Whom God shall make manifest” when he appeared.
- Tafsir-i-Hu [Commentary on “He”], a commentary on the names and attributes of God.
- Tafsir-i-Hurufat-i-Muqatta’ih [Commentary on the Isolated Letters], commenting on a passage from the Qur’an [24-35] known as the verse of light.
- Lawh-i-Fitnih[Tablet of the Test], written for Princess Shams-i-Jihán, a granddaughter of Fath-'Alí Sháh, a friend of Táhirih.
- Lawh-i-Húríyyih [Tablet of the Maiden], a dialogue between Bahá’u’lláh, writing as the Supreme Manifestation of God, and a Maid of Heaven, in order to explain the purpose of Divine Revelation.

The following writings from Bahá’u’lláh's final years in Baghdad depict ecstatic visions and anticipate his declaration in April 1863 which would bring him and his followers further suffering:

- Az-Bágh-i-Iláhí [From the Divine Garden], a poem acclaiming the Báb's revelation and the coming of the Day of God.
- Hálih Halih ya Bisharat [Hallelujah O glad tidings], an ecstatic poem in celebration of the descent of the Maid of Heaven.
- Ḥúr-i-‘Ujáb [The Wondrous Maiden], written in ecstatic language and announcing the appearance of the Maid of heaven, the rejection by the people of the world of her announcement, and her sorrow as she returned to her abode.
- Lawh-i-Ashiq va Ma’shuq [Tablet of the Lover and the Beloved], addressed to the ‘nightingale of God', and proclaiming the blooming of a new flower in the ‘rose garden of changeless splendour’.
- Lawh-i-Ghulámu'l-Khuld[Tablet of the Immortal Youth], written in esoteric language and describing the appearance of Baháʼu’lláh as the Immortal Youth, comparing his beauty to that of Joseph, revealing him as the Maid of Heaven, and calling his lovers to him.
- Lawh-i-Huriyyih [Tablet of the Divine Maiden], relating his meeting with the Maid of Heaven, who passes away with grief at learning of his intense suffering.
- Shikkar-Shikan-Shavand [With greater sweetness], written in poetic language, forecasting opposition and extolling the dedication of the loved ones of God despite persecution.
- Subhana Rabbiya’l-A’la [Praised be Our Lord Most High], celebrates the renewal of the mystic realm via a vision of the Maid of heaven, and foreshadows future tests.
- Lawh-i-Mallahu'l-Quds [Tablet of the Holy Mariner], which relates two versions of a mystical text involving the launch of Baháʼu’lláh's Crimson Ark, from which some people would be banished for wishing to rise above what God had ordained as being their station.
- Lawh-i-Bulbulu’l-Firáq [Tablet of Nightingale of Separation], sorrowfully declaring his departure from Baghdad whilst rebuking those who had failed to recognise him.
- Suriy-i-Sabr [Surah of Patience], written as he was departing Baghdad on the first day of Ridvan, and praising the believers who had been involved in the Nayriz upheaval of 1850.
- Ḥūr-i `Ujāb[Tablet of the Wondrous Maiden], an ecstatic poem announcing the descent of the Maid of Heaven.

Following his return from Sulaymaniyah Bahá’u’lláh’s status as the prime leader of the Bábís was soon recognised by the Bábís themselves, and by the Ottoman and Iranian authorities, with a growing respect from the general population. Fearing that his influence would reignite Bábí activity in Iran the Iranian government asked the Ottomans to return him, which they refused to do, inviting him instead to Istanbul.

On April 22nd 1863, twelve days before his departure from Baghdad, Bahá’u’lláh moved to a garden beside the river Tigris, naming it the Garden of Ridván and announcing to some of his closest followers that he was “He Whom God shall make Manifest” promised by his predecessor, the Báb. This was a defining moment in the emergence from Bábism of the Baháʼí Faith as its successor. On May 3, accompanied by members of his family, followers and servants, Bahá’u’lláh began the journey to Istanbul [Constantinople], where he stayed for four months before orders were given for him to be moved on to Edirne [Adrianople].

== 1863–1868, exiles in Istanbul and Edirne ==
During his journey from Baghdad to Istanbul and the four months which he spent in exile there Baháʼu’lláh wrote:

- Mathnaviyí-i Mubárak [The Blessed Couplets], announcing the Day of God and the divine springtime, which can only be recognised by those with a spiritual eye.
- Lawḥ-i Hawdaj (Tablet of the Howdah), written as he approached Sāmsūn, on the shore of the Black Sea, and proclaiming the fulfilment of what he had previously foretold in the Tablet of the Holy Mariner.
- Lawh-i-Náqús [Tablet of the Bell], written to commemorate the twentieth anniversary of the declaration of the Bab.
- Lawh-i-‘Abdu'l-‘Azíz-Va-Vukalá [Tablet to the Sultan], written in response to an edict from the Sultan, banishing Bahá’u’lláh, his family and followers, to Adrianople [Edirne]. The original was lost, the contents being incorporated into the Súriy-i-Mulúk [Tablet to the Kings]

=== First period in Edirne, December 1863 – March 1866 ===
By the time Bahá’u’lláh arrived in Edirne the situation concerning his half brother, Azal, had reached a climax following more than ten years of contention over leadership of the Bábí community, culminating in 1865 with an attempt by Azal to poison Bahá’u’lláh which left him with a permanent tremor in his hand. His writings at this time stressed the relationship of his revelation with that of the Báb and the prophets of old, and included veiled references to a glorious splendour to come. Writings from this period include:

- Lawh-i-Ahmad-i-'Arabi [Arabic Tablet of Ahmad], consoles and encourages steadfastness in its recipient, assuring help in the face of difficulties and confirming the Báb's station.
- Lawh-i-Ahmad-i-Fársi [Persian Tablet of Ahmad], explains the importance of purity of heart as a prime condition for spiritual search, compares his revelation to an ocean giving up its pearls in amounts equal to the ardour of the search, and states that 'this fathomless and surging ocean is near, astonishingly near, unto you.'
- Lawh-i-Anta’l-Kafi [The Long Healing Prayer], written in rhyme with a repeated refrain, appealing to God with his various names, for healing.
- Lawh-i-Fitnih [Tablet of the Test], telling of a time of trial and tests to come involving all created things and which will violently lay hold on all people.
- Lawh-i-Haqq [Tablet of the True One], proclaiming the advent of the Spirit of Truth around which all the prophets of old circle, and reproaching the Bábís for rejecting Bahá’u’lláh.
- Lawh-i-Nuqtih [Tablet of the Point], explains the difference between everything that has been revealed from eternity to eternity just as the point differentiates words and letters.
- Lawh-i-Qina’ [Tablet of the Veil], refutes allegations of grammatical errors in the writings of the Bab made by the leader of the Shaykhi school, declares that divine revelation is not bound by man-made rules by offering examples from the Qur’an and challenges him with Bahá’u’lláh's own prophetic claim.
- Lawh-i-Sayyáh [Tablet of the Traveller], announcing Bahá’u’lláh's messianic claim and calling on the Bábís to accept it; tells of a mystical journey to people who despite outward piety were nevertheless veiled from recognising truth, and foretells his future exile to Akka.
- Lawh-i-Tawhid [Tablet of the Divine Unity], a discourse on God's supremacy, the signs of which permeate the whole of creation; a God who can only be known through his manifestations who from age to age invite people to approach his cause as they would a friend.
- Súriy-i-Asháb [Surah of the Companions], proclaiming his prophetic station to a few receptive souls, and stating that if an amount to an extent smaller than a needle's eye were to be revealed to humanity, every mountain would crumble.
- Súriy-i-‘Ibád [Tablet of the Servants], in which he affirms his prophetic claim in line with previous Revelations, describes his journey from Baghdad to Edirne, and offers explicit instructions to several named followers.
- Súriy-i-Damm [Tablet of Blood], declaring the oneness of the Prophets focusing on a vision of words from the Imám Husayn as he was dying.
- Súriy-i-Qadír [Surih of the Omnipotent], focusing on the power of Spirit being released into the world for the believers.

=== Middle period in Edirne, March 1866 – September 1867 ===
Following the attempted poisoning, Bahá’u’lláh addressed Azal formally in the Súriy-i-Amr [Chapter of command], in which he proclaimed himself to be "He whom God shall make manifest", whilst for the first time making reference to his followers as the "people of Bah’á". In March 1866 Bahá’u’lláh retired to the home of a Bábí from where he instructed the Bábís to make a choice between himself and Azal, and by the end of this two-month period known as the “Most Great Separation”, the majority of Bábís had identified themselves as Baháʼís. In September 1867 Azal challenged Bahá’u’lláh to mubahala in order to allow God to judge between the two factions, and although Bahá’u’lláh agreed, Azal failed to attend the planned meeting. It was during his years of exile in Constantinople and Edirne that Bahá’u’lláh began writing a series of letters to the kings and leaders of the world in which he announced his claim to be the latest messenger of God. Writings from this period include:

- Suriy-i-Amr [Surah of Command], a major announcement read aloud to Azal, clarifying the nature of his [Bahá’u’lláh's] station, written partly in his own voice and partly as the voice of God.
- Suratu’llah [Surah of God], in which he declares his Divine station, admonishes the Báb's followers for plotting against him, and communicated his temporary withdrawal from the community.
- Lawh-i-Rasul [Tablet to Rasul], in which he relates to past prophets through his sufferings and declares his intention to depart from both friend and foe.
- Suriy-i-Hijr [Surah of Separation], an announcement of his withdrawal from the community and anguish at the circumstances that made it necessary.
- Súriy-i-Mulúk [Surah of the Kings], addressed to royalty, leaders of Christianity, the French Ambassador in Constantinople, ministers of the Ottoman Sultan, the Sultan, the Persian Ambassador to the Sultan, the people of Persia and the religious and wise men of Constantinople, all of whom he counsels and/or rebukes, and asks to heed the voice of God.
- Lawh-i-Baha [Tablet of Baha], identifies himself with past prophets through his sufferings, compares Mirza Yahya to Balaam, who cursed Moses, and requests his followers to enter the ‘ark of eternity’ on the ‘crimson sea’.
- Lawh-i-Laylatu’l-Quds [Tablet of the Sacred Night], in which Bahá’u’lláh exports his followers to be united. Several passages have been translated by Shoghi Effendi and are included in Gleanings.
- Lawh-i-Rúh [Tablet of the Spirit], in which Bahá’u’lláh refers to his mission, and to opposition from Bábís who followed Mírzá Yaḥyá.
- Lawh-i-Sarraj [Tablet to Sarraj], lengthy text answering questions concerning the enigma of Azal's position amongst the Azali Bábís in relation to Bahá’u’lláh's claims, and alluding to statements from the Bab declaring that by turning away from the light of truth virtues become vices.
- Suriy-i-Bayan [Surah of Utterance], in which he instructs the recipient to be in a state of detachment from the world when teaching the Cause of God, afire with the love of God, and calling to the Maid of Heaven to assist those who do so, telling him to take the message to certain individuals and regions of Iran.
- Súriy-i-Hajj 1 and 2 [Surahs of Pilgrimage], stipulating the rites required when making pilgrimage to the House of the Báb in Shiraz and of Baháʼu’lláh in Baghdad. Later ratified in the Kitáb-i-Aqdas.
- Suriy-i-Qadir [Surah of the Omnipotent], a meditation on the all-encompassing influence in the world of the name of God ‘the Omnipotent’; and in reference to the opposition of Azal, inviting the Bábís and those in power to recognize Bahá’u’lláh.
- Suriy-i-Zubur [Surah of the Writings], explaining the reasons for withdrawing from the community, as a result of which he has hidden his reality behind the veils, and asks the recipient to announce and defend his cause both in writing and in person, with the assurance that divine confirmations will follow.
- Lawh-i-Mubahilih [Tablet of the Confrontation], written in praise of Quddus, an early disciple and martyr of the Báb. Gives background to the circumstances regarding which led to the irreparable rift between Bahá’u’lláh and Azal.

=== Final period in Edirne, September 1867 – August 1868 ===
Baháʼu’lláh's final year in Edirne proved to be the most productive of his forty-year ministry, his writings covering a plethora of subjects including justice, medicine, alchemy, cosmology, history, as well as the rift with Azal, whilst extending his communications to individuals to the Shah of Iran, the Prime Minister of the Ottoman Empire and the Emperor of France. Writings from this time include:

- Kitáb-i-Badíʻ (The Wondrous Book), a book written in reply to questions from the judge of the Persian community in Istanbul concerning Baháʼu’lláh's claim to be the successor to the Bab, thus taking Mirza Yahya's place as head of the community. The judge noted that the Bab's intention had been to leave the completion of the Persian Bayan to ‘He whom God shall make manifest’, Baháʼu’lláh informing him that the Kitab-i-Iqan [Book of Certitude] was its completion. Reference is made Mirza Yahya's treachery and rebelliousness, countering his claim that the Bab had given a position of authority.
- Lawh-i-‘Abdu’r-Razzáq [Tablet to ‘Abdu’r-Razzáq], which centres on some Bábí misconceptions and questions regarding the origin of creation, the soul following death and the lack of historical records preceding Adam.
- Lawh-i-Ashraf [The Tablet to Ashraf], addressed to Siyyid Ashraf-i Zanjani with instructions as to what to do when he returned to Iran from visiting Bahá’u’lláh in Edirne, and what news he should share.
- Lawh-i-Mawlúd [Tablet of the Birth], written in honour of Baháʼu’lláh's birthday, celebrating the culmination of past ages and cycles in the birth of divine revelation.
- Lawh-i-Nasír [Tablet to Nasír], confirming everlasting divine guidance and grace which, as long as the seed falls on fertile soil, will produce fruit.
- Lawh-i-Quds [Tablet of Holiness], a call to recognise Baháʼu’lláh, and confirming his mission following on from that of the Báb.
- Lawh-i-Salman I [First Tablet to Salman]. Addressed to Shaykh Salman, Baháʼu’lláh's messenger [and later, Abdu’l-Baha's], who for 40 years travelled thousands of miles on foot carrying letters back and forth between Baháʼu’lláh's various exiles and Baháʼís in Iran. In the Tablet Baháʼu’lláh expresses his sorrow regarding Azal's opposition, affirms that since God is unknowable knowledge of him can only be attained through his messengers, and covers various spiritual subjects including a comparison of the state of belief with that of unbelief.
- Lawh-i-Máriyyih [Tablet of Mary], written in symbolic language, explaining a mysterious statement on alchemy attributed to the Prophetess, Mary.
- Lawh-i-Tibb[Tablet to the Physician], focusing on medicine and healing.
- Lawh-i- Tuqá [Tablet of Divine Virtue], inviting people to enter the 'Crimson Ark', addressing objections made by those who repudiate the divine verses, and warning people who deny the 'Most Great Announcement', as did Mírzá Yaḥyá.
- Lawh-i- Yúsuf [Tablet to Yusuf], addresses the importance of detachment in gaining understanding of spiritual truth, and explains terms such as “paradise” and “resurrection”.
- Ridvánu’l-‘Adl [The Paradise of Justice], acclaiming the virtue of justice, explaining its origin and purpose, and asking kings, rulers, the people of the world and the Bábís to champion it.
- Ridvánu’l-Iqrár [The Paradise of Recognition], comparing the condition of those who recognise the truth with those who reject it.
- Súriy-i-A’ráb [Surah of the Arabs], in which he offers encouragement to those who are Arabs amongst his followers, and in remembrance of the years he lived amongst them in ‘Iraq.
- Súriy-i-Asmá’ [Surah of Names], written in response to objections made to his claims by some Bábís, beseeching them not to be prevented from recognising the truth by the veil of names; explains that outward differences between sacred scriptures emanate from differences in humanity's capacity to comprehend.
- Súriy-i-Ahzán [Surah of Sorrows], which focuses on the sorrows which the Báb and Baháʼu’lláh experienced.
- Súriy-i-Dhibh [Surah of the Sacrifice], which encourages the reader to investigate the Cause of God for himself, and stating that over the preceding twenty years he, Baháʼu’lláh, has been offered as a sacrifice by the wicked.
- Súriy-i-Dhikr [Surah of Remembrance], in which Baháʼu’lláh, writing in the voice of the Báb, declares his mystical identity with him.
- Súriy-i-Fadl [Surah of Grace], a call to the recipient to boldly inform the Báb's followers of Baháʼu’lláh's claim.
- Súriy-i-Fath [Tablet to Fath-i-A’zam], in which he conveys his weariness to a close early follower concerning the arrogant objections and frivolous questions coming from the uninformed, mentions the defection of believers, and proclaims that he would prefer to die a thousand deaths that suffer the calumny which Azal was spreading.
- Súriy-i-Ghusn [Tablet of the Branch]. The issue of who would succeed him having arisen, Baháʼu’lláh praised ‘Abbas (later titled ‘Abdu’l-Baha), his eldest son, as the ‘Most Great Branch’, clearly foretelling his future appointment as his successor, but without naming him directly.
- Súriy-i-Ism [Surah of the Name], asking the recipient to detach himself from names and designations and to pronounce the glad tidings, and calling on people to free themselves from the bondage of self.
- Súriy-i-Ismuna’l-Mursil [Surah of Our Name, the Sender], a meditation focusing on the name of God, 'the Sender', its various current and future manifestations.
- Súriy-i-Javád [Tablet to Javád], recalling idol worshippers from the past and condemning their blind imitation.
- Súriy-i-Khitáb [Surah of Utterance], praising the recipient for recognising him having failed to do so earlier, before Baháʼu’lláh's declaration, and asks the Bábís to recognise him as the return of the Báb.
- Súriy-i-Ma’áni [Surah of Divine Mytsteries], written in praise of God and his Messengers.
- Súriy-i-Qahir [Tablet to Qahir], in which he affirms his mystical identity with the Báb, addresses particular objections regarding his claim put forward by followers of the Báb, bewails their treatment of him, and expresses his fears for ‘Him who will come after Me’, which he repeated in the Suriy-i-Haykal.
- Súriy-i-Qalam [Surah of the Pen], in celebration of the festival of Ridvan.
- Súriy-i-Qamis [Surah of the Shirt], forming a conversation between the Báb and Baháʼu’lláh and announcing the Báb's return in the person of Baháʼu’lláh; upbraiding the Bábís for their denial and asking one of the recipients of the tablet to place it, like the shirt of Joseph in the Bible, on his face.
- Súriy-i-Sultán [Tablet to Sultan-Abad], addressed to a number of followers in the town of Sultan-Abad to whom he offers praise and encouragement, with a message to Azal reproaching him for his hostile behaviour, encouraging him to repent and assuring him that he bears no hatred toward him.
- Súriy-i-Vafá [Surah of Faithfulness], calls on the recipient to be the quintessence of faithfulness, affirms Baháʼu’lláh's mystical identity with the Báb, and answers several questions.
- Súriy-i-Ziyárih [Surah of Visitation], addressed to Mullá Husayn, the first to believe in the Báb.
- Súriy-i-Zuhúr [Surah of Revelation] in which asserts that his revelation is a testimony of God separating truth from error.
- Lawh-i-Napulyún [First Tablet to Napoleon III], describing the sufferings experienced by Baháʼu’lláh and his followers and asserting their innocence, pointing out two pronouncements he had made on behalf of the oppressed and exhorting Napoleon to investigate the conditions suffered by those who were being persecuted, including Baháʼu’lláh and his fellow exiles.
- Lawh-i-Sultán [Tablet to the King of Persia] Addressed to Nasiri'd-Din Shah, this is the longest of Baháʼu’lláh's Tablets sent to a monarch, the messenger who delivered it in person losing his life as a result.
- Súriy-i-Ra'is [Surah to the Chief], written to Ali Pasha, the Ottoman Prime Minister as Baháʼu’lláh, along with his followers and family, were being exiled from Edirne via Gallipoli to the prison city of ‘Akká; describes his expulsion from Edirne, answers a question on the nature of the soul from a follower, and admonishes Ali Pasha for his abuse of power.
- Lawh-i-Siráj [Tablet of the Luminary], exposing incorrect facts made by Mírzá Yaḥyá and his followers concerning Baháʼu’lláh, and explaining why the Báb assigned Yaḥyá to a position of authority in the Bábí community despite Baháʼu’lláh's condemnation of him in several of his writings.

== 1868–1892, exile in ‘Akká ==
The split between Baháʼu’lláh and Azal, and the attempt of the Azali faction to discredit Baháʼu’lláh with the Ottoman authorities, led to Baháʼu’lláh's further exile, along with most of his family and followers, this time to the prison city of ‘Akká in Ottoman Syria. Azal and a handful of his followers were sent to Famagusta, on the island of Cyprus. The two groups, along with an armed escort, left Edirne together on 12 August 1868, with Baháʼu’lláh and his group arriving at ‘Akká by sea on 31 August. Conditions in the barracks-citadel during the first two years were atrocious, easing when in November 1870 the prisoners were moved to confinement in the city. As a result of the overthrow of Sultan Abdulaziz in 1876 the order of imprisonment was annulled, and Baháʼu’lláh was finally able to leave ‘Akká, staying first of all in a villa nearby before moving to the Mansion of Bahji, where he died on 29 May 1892.

Baháʼu’lláh’s writings at this time focused on the conclusion of his proclamatory letters to the kings and rulers, his book of laws, the Kitab-i-Aqdas, and letters expounding upon the universal and uniting social principles of his new Faith.

=== First period in ‘Akká, 1868–1873 ===
During this first period in ‘Akká, the first two years of which Baháʼu’lláh, his family and followers, endured brutal conditions in the barracks-citadel, Baháʼu’lláh's writings focused on continuing his summons to the kings and rulers which he had started in Edirne.

- Lawh-i-Pap [Tablet to Pope Pius IX] in which Baháʼu’lláh claims to be the return of Christ expected by the Christians, warns against allowing human learning to veil truth, calls on the monks to come out of seclusion and the people of all religions to rush towards the great Ocean which sustains them; instructs the Pope to sell his priceless possessions and expend them in the path of God.
- Lawh-i-Napulyun II [Second Tablet to Napoleon III], written in response to Napoleon III’s distainful comments to his first Tablet Baháʼu’lláh calls upon the Pope to ‘tell the priests to ring the bells no longer’, announcing that he is the one whom Christ promised and calling on the monks to come out of seclusion; lists his sufferings during his exiles, directs the Emperor to protect his subjects with justice, charges him and the people of the world to teach the Cause of God through the power of utterance, to be trustworthy, and to conceal the sins of others.
- Lawh-i-Malik-i-Rus [Tablet to Czar Alexander II]. Baháʼu’lláh informs the Czar that he has answered his secret wish, and praises him for offering, through one of his ministers, aid when he was imprisoned in the dungeon of Tehran. Having called on him to be a champion of the cause of God and declared that he, Baha’u’llah, is the one promised by both Isaiah and Christ, he warns of the transience of earthly possessions.
- Lawh-i-Malikih [Tablet to Queen Victoria], in which he praises the queen for British parliamentary democracy and the abolition of the slave trade, states that promises in the Christian Gospel have been fulfilled, decrees that ‘the mightiest instrument for the healing of all the world is the union of all its peoples in one universal Cause, one common Faith’, and gives instructions to the kings of the earth in relation to their expenditure and the procurement of lasting peace.
- Suriy-i-Haykal [Surah of the Temple]. Started in Edirne and completed in Akka, in which Baháʼu’lláh identifies himself as the promised Temple through which Israel and all mankind will be redeemed, and combines it with his Tablets to Pope Pius IX, Emperor Napoleon III, Czar Alexander II, Queen Victoria, and Nasiru’d-Din Shah.

Baháʼu’lláh culminated his summons to the kings and rulers with the Kitáb-i-Aqdas, which was also the principal source of the laws and ordinances of the Baháʼí Faith:

- Kitáb-i-Aqdas [The Most Holy Book]. Central book of the Baháʼí Faith in which Baháʼu’lláh sets out Baháʼí laws as well as addressing subjects such as Baháʼí institutions and social principles, warns against fanaticism, contention and dispute, and prescribes virtues including chastity, truthfulness, courtesy, justice, cleanliness and tolerance.

Other works written during these early years in ‘Akka period include:

- Lawh-i-Ra’is [Tablet to the Chief]. In this second tablet to the Ottoman Prime Minister ‘All Pasha, Baháʼu'lláh admonishes him for his cruelty and for his treatment of the Bahá’ís imprisoned in the citadel of ‘Akká, warning him of the impermanence of his worldly power. Baháʼu'lláh also reminds him of his previous Tablet sent whilst travelling to Akka from Edirne, in which he had requested a personal meeting with him, which never materialised.
- Lawh-i-Ahbab [Tablet of the Friends], in which he offers advice, reassurance and encouragement to his followers, bidding them to be detached from the things of the world, to be united, to promote God’s cause; expressing his sorrow regarding those, including Bábís, who have rejected His message.
- Lawh-i-Aqdas [Most Holy Tablet/Tablet to the Christians]. Addressed to an unnamed Christian and to Christians in general, including the clergy, Baháʼu'lláh announces his station as the fulfilment of Christian prophesy and admonishes the Christians for failing to recognise him. The Tablet ends with a succession of beatitudes similar to in the Sermon on the Mount.
- Lawh-i-Baqa [Tablet of Immortality], offering the recipient assurance of an exalted status in the world to come, advising him to serve the Cause of God and to practise detachment.
- Lawh-i-Basitatu’l-Haqiqah [Tablet on the Uncompounded Reality]. Enlightens the recipient on an utterance by philosopher Mulla Sadra stating that ‘the uncompounded reality is all things’ and gives an explanation of the difference and/or similarity between ‘the oneness of being’’ and ‘the oneness of appearances’.
- Lawh-i-Fu’ad [Tablet to Fu’ad Pasha] Addressed to S͟hayk͟h Káẓim-i-Samandar, one of Baháʼu’lláh's Apostles, and written following the recent death of Fu'ád Páshá, foreign minister of the Ottoman Empire and associate of the Grand Vizir Âli Pasha, who had exiled Baháʼu'lláh to the prison city of ‘Akká. Having reprimanded Fu'ád Páshá Baháʼu’lláh then forecasts the downfall of both the Sultan and Grand Vizir Âli Pasha, both of which came to pass soon afterwards. It was through the fulfilment of this prophesy that Mírzá Abu'l-Faḍl, one of the Baháʼí Faith's most prominent scholars, became a believer.
- Lawh-i-Hirtik [Tablet to Georg David Hardegg]. Addressed to Georg David Hardegg, one of the co-founders of the German Templer society and head of the community in Haifa, inviting him to ponder the ascendancy and sweetness of the word of God through which those who are abased are enabled to be exalted and vice versa. Baháʼu'lláh also uses the science of letters and their numerical values in order to explain the significance of specific names, and stresses that he and Hardegg are stirred by the same divine spirit.
- Lawh-i-Husayn [Tablet to Husayn]. Tells the recipient to commune with God and to be oblivious of anything but Him; correlates all creation with mirrors reflecting the light of the Sun of Truth to the extent that they turn towards it; affirms the healing and purifying power of God's love; notes that God's prophets wouldn't have assented to persecution if human life comes to an end with physical death.
- Lawh-i-Ru’ya [Tablet of the Vision]. Relates a vision of the Maid of Heaven personified as the Holy Spirit, celebrating the anniversary of the birth of the Báb.
- Lawh-i-Sahab [Tablet of the Cloud], in which Baháʼu’lláh mentions his recent Tablets to Nasiru’d-Din Shah and Napoleon III, acclaims the prophetic importance the Holy Land and his exile, and advises his followers how best to proclaim his message.
- Lawh-i-Salman II [Second Tablet to Salman], drawing attention to the transience of the physical world and the consequences for those who continue to be immersed in it.
- Lawh-i-Shaykh Fani [Tablet to Shaykh Fani]. Stresses that a true believer in the unity of God must regard God as being above any comparison with which men have compared him, likening this concept to the relationship between a craftsman and his handiwork. Explains the nature of self-surrendering the will to God.
- Qad Ihtaraqa’l-Mukhlisun [The Fire Tablet], written in rhyming prose in response to questions by a Baháʼí believer from Iran, this Tablet forms a conversation between Baháʼu'lláh and God, to whom Baháʼu’lláh expounds his sufferings.
- Salat-i-Mayyit [Prayer for the Dead]. The only Bahá’í congregational prayer, recited prior to internment by one person while all others present remain silent.
- Su’al va Javab [Questions and Answers], explanations, and answers to questions connected to laws in the Kitab-i-Aqdas.
- Suriy-i-Amin [Tablet to Amin], in which he commends the recipient for his resolve, and mentions the youth, Badi’, who paid the ultimate sacrifice for delivering Baháʼu'lláh's epistle to Nasiru’d-Din Shah.
- Suriy-i-Hifz [Surah of Protection], commenting on Mírzá Yahyá’s opposition to Baha’u’llah, his plan to have Baha’u’llah killed which was foiled through divine protection, and the offer of forgiveness by Baha’u’llah in the event of Mírzá Yahyá’s repentance.

=== Middle and Late period in ‘Akká, 1873–1892 ===
During his final 19 years Baháʼu'lláh wrote many of his most significant works predominantly setting out principles, several of which focus on the core teachings of the Baháʼí Faith:

- Is͟hráqát (Splendours), covering various aspects including an explanation of the principle of infallibility, a discussion of personal virtues, specifically trustworthiness, explains the authority pertaining to the Manifestations of God, and lists the nine Ishraqs (splendors), being: religion as the means of all human prosperity and progress; promotion of the ‘Lesser Peace’ by the rulers of the world; obedience to God's commandments; importance of upright character and performance of deeds of service; governments to rule with justice and equity; establishment of a universal language in order to bring unity to all mankind: education of children and important state of parenthood; responsibilities for the well-being of humankind given to the House of Justice; religion the most powerful instrument in establishing world unity.
- Kalimát-i-Firdawsíyyih (Words of Paradise), announcing eleven ‘leaves of paradise’: fear of God; upholding the cause of religion; the golden rule; that rulers possess good character and practice justice, in contrast to Muḥammad Sháh; the importance of wisdom and its connection to reward and punishment; justice; unity of mankind; training and education of children; moderation; renouncing monasticism and asceticism; avoidance of religious strife and dissension.
- Lawḥ-i-Maqṣúd (Tablet of Maqṣúd), setting out the teachings necessary for establishing world peace, including universal education, justice, unity, wisdom, moderation, consultation, service to the human race, the need for the rulers of the world to lay the foundations for the ‘Lesser Peace’, the establishment of a universal script and language, and respect for the power of human utterance, specifically he Word of God, the ‘master key for the whole world’.
- Lawḥ-i-Dunyá (Tablet of the World), reiterates many of Baháʼu'lláh's social teachings including detachment from worldly desires, living a virtuous life, avoidance of contention and conflict, observance of courtesy, promotion of fellowship among all peoples and association with people of all religions, promotion of the Lesser Peace, adoption of a universal language and the universal education of children, the establishment of a constitutional government and recognition of the importance of agriculture.
- Tajallíyát (Effulgences), expounds on four effulgences, being knowledge of God through His Manifestation, steadfastness in the Cause of God, acquisition of knowledge which profits mankind, and the subject of Divinity, Godhead and the like.
- Ṭarázát (Ornaments), comprising six headings relating to qualities which every individual should aim to achieve: knowledge of self and acquisition of a useful profession, fellowship with the followers of all religions, striving for a good character, practice of trustworthiness, importance of craftsmanship, acquisition of knowledge, and the importance of fairness and honesty in newspaper reporting.
- Bis͟hárát (Glad-Tidings), constituting fifteen headings: the abolition of holy war, fellowship with the followers of all religions, adoption of a universal auxiliary language, obligation to serve just monarchs, obedience to government, establishment of the ‘Lesser Peace’, freedom in choice of clothing and facial hair, abandonment of monasticism, instead focusing on work for the betterment of humanity, abrogation of the Báb's law concerning the destruction of books, promotion of the study of arts and sciences, engagement in an occupation given the status of worship, entrusting the affairs of the people to the Universal House of Justice, abrogates the requirement of making special journeys to visit the graves of the dead, and commends a combination of a constitutional monarchy combined with representative democracy in the governance of human affairs.
- Lawh-i-Manikchi Sahib [Tablet to Manikchi Sahib]. Consisting of 19 paragraphs, emphasising the universality of Baháʼu'lláh's prophetic claim, and clarifying several central Baháʼí teachings.

During this period Baháʼu'lláh's writings also deal with questions of a philosophical and theological nature:

- Lawh-i-‘Abdu’l-Vahhab [Tablet to ‘Abdu’l-Vahhab]. Deals with a question concerning the soul of man and its survival after death, alludes to the state of the soul in the next world which is impossible to describe, and affirms that in order to protect the human race he has concealed the true reality of this subject.
- Lawh-i-Amvaj [Tablet of the Waves]. Explaining that the ocean of utterance has surged with four waves: the light of unity will illumine the whole world; trustworthiness is the most befitting vesture; the transcendence of God; casting aside the causes of abasement in order to take firm hold of those things which leads to exaltation.
- Lawh-i-Bismillih [Tablet of "In the Name of God"]. In this Tablet Baháʼu'lláh stresses the importance of independent investigation of spiritual reality on attaining maturity, involving a comprehension of why some choose to follow the path of faith whilst others don't; addresses why each religion believes that it has exclusive possession of truth and why the Prophets of the past were initially rejected.
- Lawh-i-Burhan [Tablet of the Proof]. Using strong language, Baháʼu'lláh rebukes two members of the Shiite clergy for their involvement in the martyrdom of two prominent Baháʼís; he sets out the essential spiritual requirements for the truly learned, summoning them to examine his writings in order to determine the truth of his cause.
- Lawh-i-Haft Pursish [Tablet of the Seven Questions]. Answers to eschatological, theological and social questions from a prominent Zoroastrian living in Yazd.
- Lawh-i-Haqqu’n-Nas [Tablet of the Right of the People]. Written in answer to a question regarding how actions in the physical world impact justice in the next, explaining the metaphorical character of this world: everything which exists in the physical world is manifested in the divine worlds, the things of the spiritual world therefore having completely different characteristics from those of the physical world.
- Lawḥ-i-Ḥikmat (Tablet of Wisdom), in which he imparts guidance regarding individual conduct, propounds the basic beliefs of some of the philosophers of ancient Greece, including Empedocles, Pythagoras, Hippocrates, Socrates, Plato, Aristotle, Balinus, and Hermes, and explains the essence and fundamentals of true philosophy.
- Lawh-i-Ittihad [Tablet of Unity], explaining six types of unity: unity of religion, unity of words, unity of ritual acts, unity of rank and station, unity of wealth and unity of souls.
- Lawh-i-Jamal [Tablet to Jamal Burujirdi]. Advising the recipient to show forth love, humility and detachment when communicating with people holding different views, bearing in mind the fact that each soul is created with a different state of understanding.
- Lawh-i-Karim [Tablet to Karim]. Explaining ways in which people discern the truth, some recognising it immediately and some requiring the aid of a teacher, further explaining that some can be taught with words, some by actions and deeds, and others by example. Baháʼu'lláh also states that the purpose of his revelation is not to enforce earthly commandments, but to manifest the evidences of perfection in human souls, so that their spirits can be raised up and that the things which their minds find hard to comprehend will become evident. He also condemns imaginary theories from some Muslims concerning the Promised One.
- Lawh-i-Raqsha [Tablet of the She-Serpent]. Describes the fury and divine justice administered to two members of the Shiite clergy for their involvement in the martyrdom of two prominent Baháʼís, as mentioned in the Lawh-i-Burhan, and extends praise for a few of his followers.
- Lawh-i-Siyyid Mihdiy-i-Dahaji [Tablet to Siyyid Mihdiy-i-Dahaji]. Commends a prominent teacher of the Baháʼí Faith and affirms the power of utterance as the key to victory, to be offered with tact and wisdom, moderation, and a pure spirit.
- Suriy-i-Dhabih [Tablet to Dhabih]. Calls the Baháʼís to show forth upright conduct, high moral character and adherence to worldly authority, with a warning that the misdeeds of those claiming to be his followers cause greater harm to his Cause than his imprisonment and persecution.
- Tafsir-i-Va’sh-Shams [Commentary on the Surah of the Sun]. Gives a comprehensive interpretation of a short surah of the Qur’an, relates a number of symbolic meanings for the word ‘sun’, and discloses limitless meanings of the Word of God to be understood according to both their outward and inward meanings and revealed in relation to the capacity of the hearers.
- Ziyarat-Namih [Tablet of Visitation]. The title of a category of prayers which were written at different times in honour of certain people who had passed on. The most notable was collated by Nabil Zarandi after Baháʼu'lláh's death, and is often read in his Shrine.

The following three major works, written in his final years, argued for the validity of the new religion and established the provisions for its organization and propagation:

- Lawḥ-i-Karmil (Tablet of Carmel), written during a visit to Mount Carmel in the style of a dialogue between Baháʼu'lláh and the mountain, in which he invites it to celebrate the fact that God had established his throne upon it; this is regarded as a prophecy predicting the building of the Shrine of the Báb and creation of the Baháʼí World Centre and Universal House of Justice.
- Lawh-i-Ibn-i-Dhi’b (Epistle to the Son of the Wolf), Baháʼu'lláh's last major work, and third longest, addressed to the son of a prominent Shi’ite mulla in Shiraz who was known for his brutal persecution of the Baháʼís, and whose treatment of the Baháʼís was as merciless as that of his father. Baháʼu'lláh warns him regarding the consequences of his deeds, reveals for him a prayer through which to implore forgiveness, and shares with him a long summary of his principal teachings, quoting extensively from his own previous writings using slightly different wording from the original.
- Kitáb-i-ʻAhd [Book of the Covenant]. Baháʼu'lláh's last will and testament, in which he clearly appointed his eldest son, ʻAbdu'l-Bahá, the Most Great Branch, as His successor, and clarified that where in earlier works he alluded to ʻAbdu'l-Bahá, it was to ʻAbdu'l-Bahá that he was referring. Consequently, when on 28 May 1892 Baháʼu'lláh passed away the will was read publicly, there was no initial uncertainty as to whom the believers should turn to.

== Religious significance ==
Baháʼu'lláh's writings, together with those of the Báb and ʻAbdu'l-Bahá (and the authenticated transcripts of ʻAbdu'l-Bahá's talks), make up the scriptures of the Baháʼí Faith. These texts along with those authored by Shoghi Effendi and the Universal House of Justice make up the "canonical texts" of the Baháʼí Faith. The canonical texts are regarded as authoritative, whereas other Baháʼí literature reflects the views of Baháʼí individuals or organizations but might be disputed by other Baháʼís.

All of Baháʼu'lláh's works are regarded as revelation by Baháʼís, including those that were written before he announced his prophetic claim in 1863. The writings of Baháʼu'lláh and the Báb are regarded as revelation because they come from Manifestations of God. Likewise, Baháʼís view the writings of earlier Manifestations of God—such as the Buddha, Jesus, and Muhammad—as revelation like Baháʼu'lláh's writings, though not all the extant versions of these writings are seen as well preserved. Commandments from the scriptures of Manifestations of God before Baháʼu'lláh (including the Báb) are viewed as superseded by the Baháʼí laws.

== Literary reception ==
Two-thirds of Baháʼu'lláh's writings are in Arabic, with the remainder composed in Persian or in a blend of both languages. According to John Walbridge, a scholar of Islamic philosophy and intellectual history, Baháʼu'lláh wrote in a clean and elegant Arabic style, free from the unconventional features found in the Báb’s writings and from the excessive ornamentation characteristic of many of his contemporaries. His Persian style, similarly, is marked by austerity, concision, and elevation—qualities that translate well into the King James–style English used in Bahá'í translations.

The British Iranologist Edward G. Browne observed that Baháʼu'lláh brought about a remarkable evolution in both Persian and Arabic prose. He described the Book of Certitude as "a work of great merit, vigorous in style, clear in argument, cogent in proof, and displaying no slight knowledge of the Bible, Qur’an, and Traditions". Browne further compared its stylistic strength and concision to the Chahár Maqála (Four Discourses) of Nizami Aruzi, a masterpiece of classical Persian prose written seven centuries earlier. Similarly, Shapur Rasekh argues that Baháʼu'lláh’s Persian writings rank among the finest examples of classical Persian prose.

Soheil Bushrui, a Lebanese scholar of the Arabic language, conducted an in-depth analysis of the Arabic style of Bahá'u'lláh’s writing, particularly the Kitáb-i-Aqdas. According to Bushrui, Bahá'u'lláh's style is concise in form yet rich in meaning; it incorporates elements of both shi'r (poetry) and saj' (rhymed prose) but transcends the limitations of either. Its expressions possess an integrity and absolute precision that lie beyond the bounds of literary analysis. Vivid use is made of similes, metaphors, metonymy, and other linguistic embellishments, exemplifying that consummate skill in the use of Arabic which is termed badi', signifying the art of sublime and innovative expression. The hallmarks of this form of writing are its matchless precision, graceful yet compelling flow, chaste economy of diction, inimitable craftsmanship, and prodigious mastery of the language in all its multifarious ramifications. Majesty is combined with grace, refinement with simplicity, strength with delicacy, power with beauty, and authority with compassion. The text is unimpaired by—indeed, all the more effective for—its lack of a conventional literary structure.

Much of the Kitáb-i-Aqdas is composed in a species of rhymed prose—a highly regarded literary form marked by rhythmic cadences and the frequent use of terminal rhymes—that recalls, but is quite distinct from, the language of the Qur'án. It is a superb example of that polished style of writing characterized by the Arabs as 'easy yet unattainable': a style, in other words, whose effortless flow belies the consummate mastery that has gone into its composition. A feature of this style is the extraordinary concision of many of its utterances. Faced with the almost impossible challenge not only of faithfully reproducing the sense and meaning of the Kitáb-i-Aqdas but also of conveying something of its matchless eloquence, the translators faced a formidable task. The Kitáb-i-Aqdas is divided into several hundred verses, which in the English version have been grouped into numbered paragraphs. They adhere to no specific literary form in Arabic, being richer than prose but without the elaborateness and mannerisms of poetry. The style is therefore a delicate blend of features belonging to both prose and poetry, with music tempered by the discipline of precise and unequivocal expression. There is alliteration, assonance, repetition, and onomatopoeia. The timbre of the music differs from subject to subject but remains integrally associated with the dignified sonority, the stirring rhythms, and the lilting cadences of the Arabic language in which it is framed. An outstanding feature of the rhythm of the Kitáb-i-Aqdas is its use of different repetitive beats—double, triple, or quadruple—in a manner that can only imperfectly be reproduced in English. Additionally, the Kitáb-i-Aqdas utilizes other literary techniques such as juxtaposition, antithesis, metaphor, alternation of person, and personification.

Baháʼu'lláh's writings are not all in a single style; the styles vary over time and depend on the theme and his audience. In the Súriy-i-Haykal (Súrah of the Temple), Bahá'u'lláh states that he revealed his works in "nine different styles". Although no elucidation of these "nine different styles" was forthcoming from Bahá'u'lláh himself, they have been tentatively identified by Bahá'í scholar Fádil Mázindarání as follows:

1. Tablets with the tone of command and authority.
2. Those with the tone of servitude, meekness, and supplication.
3. Writings dealing with the interpretation of the old Scriptures, religious beliefs, and doctrines of the past.
4. Writings in which laws and ordinances have been enjoined for this age, and laws of the past abrogated.
5. Mystical writings.
6. Tablets concerning matters of government and world order, and those addressed to kings.
7. Tablets dealing with subjects of learning and knowledge, divine philosophy, mysteries of creation, medicine, alchemy, etc.
8. Tablets exhorting men to education, goodly character, and divine virtues.
9. Tablets dealing with social teachings.

Shapur Rasekh describes how the literary style of Baháʼu'lláh’s writings underwent significant evolution over the course of his life, reflecting both the diverse audiences he addressed and the profound spiritual themes he conveyed. The following is a summary of the key stylistic developments identified by Rasekh:

- Transition from Classical Persian to an Independent Style: Early works exhibited a close adherence to the conventions of classical Persian literature, gradually evolving into a unique and independent style that transcended traditional literary norms.
- Simplified Language for Public Addresses: the simplification of language in tablets addressed to the general public, as well as in the discursive treatises for Bábís and followers of other religions, and likewise in his laws and social teachings.
- Increased Use of Hard Arabic Vocabulary: The use of Arabic vocabulary, especially hard and complex words, became more prevalent in later works, and not used so much in the Baghdad period.
- Reduced Ornamental Devices: The use of literary embellishments, such as poetic allusions and metaphors, gradually diminished.
- Lengthier Sentences: Sentences in Bahá'u'lláh's writings tended to become longer, allowing for more complex and nuanced expressions of thought.
- Strengthened Structure and Eloquence: The overall structure and eloquence of Bahá'u'lláh's prose gained in strength and clarity, conveying profound spiritual truths with unwavering authority.
- Diminished Poetic Rhythm: The rhythmic cadence characteristic of earlier works became less prominent as sentences lengthened and the use of hard Arabic vocabulary increased.
- Adaptation to Audience: Bahá'u'lláh adapted his language to suit each specific audience. For example, works addressed to Zoroastrians were written in pure Persian, whereas those directed to Christian audiences incorporated Christian terminology and references.
- Poetic Focus: Poetry was primarily composed during the Baghdad and Tehran periods, while later works focused less on mystical themes.
- Emphasis on the Greatness of His Revelation: References to the greatness of Bahá'u'lláh’s revelation and to the significance of the present age became more pronounced in works written after the Edirne period.

Researcher and author Denis MacEoin, a former Baháʼí, has offered a literary appraisal of the writings of Baháʼu'lláh. He writes that Baháʼu'lláh's poetic works "are written in an elegant yet uncomplicated style and possess considerable freshness". Likewise, he writes that several of Baháʼu'lláh's early writings in prose "are of real literary merit", for instance that the Kitáb-i-Íqán is "written in a lucid and original Persian style." MacEoin states, however, that Baháʼu'lláh's later works are "with only a few exceptions, increasingly turgid, repetitive, and visibly lacking in the linguistic brilliance and poetic energy that characterize his early output".

== See also ==
- Baháʼí literature
- Gleanings from the Writings of Baháʼu'lláh
- Baháʼí teachings
