= ʻAbdu'l-Hamíd Ishráq-Khávari =

Iranian Baháʼí scholar

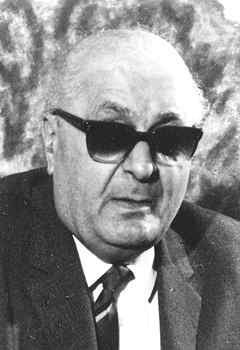
ʻAbdu'l-Hamíd Ishráq-Khávari

ʻAbdu'l-Hamíd Ishráq-Khávari (1902–1972) was a prominent Iranian Baháʼí scholar.Ishraq Khavari was born into a Muslim family.His father decided on his name by opening the Quran. The first verse on the visible page was the Arabic phrase: "Inna’hu Hamidun Majid," which means, "Indeed, He is praised and glorified." Based on this verse, he named his son Abdul-Hamid, meaning "The Servant of the Praised One." The name of his great-great-grandfather, Sheikh Muhammad, is recorded among the biographies of Shiite scholars, though details about his life are scarce. Sheikh Muhammad's son, Sheikh Abdul-Rahim (Khavari's great-grandfather), was a student of the well-known religious leader Sheikh Morteza Ansari. Sheikh Abdul-Rahim also held the position of Custodian of Astan Quds Razavi (the custodian for the Shrine of Imam Reza), a role he was appointed to by Naser al-Din Shah of the Qajar dynasty. He became a Baháʼí in 1927. He was a teacher in one of the Baháʼí schools in Iran, until the schools were closed in 1934. He prepared many compilations of Bahá'í writings, commentaries, apologetic works, and historic studies.

== Works ==
Some of his more important works are as follows:

- Abvábu'l-Malakút, a vocalized collection of Arabic Baháʼí prayers.
- Aqdáḥu'l-Faláḥ (volumes 1 and 2), comments on various subjects pertaining to the Abrahamic religions.
- Áthár-i-Qalam-i-Aʻlá, volumes 3 and 4; collections of the writings of Baháʼu'lláh.
- Dáʼiratu'l-Maʻárifu'l-Amrí, a Baháʼí Encyclopedia in 16 volumes.
- Ganjíniy-i-Ḥudúd va Aḥkám, a collection of writings on Baháʼí laws and ordinances.
- Ganj-i-Sháygán, a chronological survey of Baháʼuʼlláh's writings.
- Jannát-i-Naʻím (volumes 1 and 2), collections of the poems of Naʻím-i-Sidihí, a celebrated Baháʼí poet.
- Máʼidiy-i-Ásmání
  - volumes 1, 4, 7, 8 are collections of Bahá'u'lláh's Tablets
  - volumes 2, 5, 9 are collections of 'Abdu'l-Bahá's Tablets
  - volumes 3 and 6 are a collection of Shoghi Effendi's letters
- Muḥáḍirát (volumes 1, 2, and 3), transcribed oral conversations with Ishráq-Khávarí on various subjects.
- Núrayn-i-Nayyirayn, a biography of the Núrayn-i-Nayyirayn, two early Baháʼí martyrs.
- Payám-i-Malakút, a thematically-arranged compilation of Baháʼí writings.
- Qámús-i-Kitáb-i-Íqán, a commentary on the Kitáb-i-Íqán (Book of Certitude), four volumes.
- Qámús-i-Tawqíʻ-i-Maníʻ-i-Naw-Rúz-i-108 Badíʻ, a concordance to Shoghi Effendi's Naw-Rúz 108 BE message (in Persian).
- Raḥíq-i-Makhtúm (volumes 1 and 2), a selection of different subjects in alphabetical order in two volumes. Commentary on Shoghi Effendi's centennial letter Lawḥ-i-Qarn.
- Risáliy-i-Ayyám-i-Tisʻih, a collection of Baháʼí writings on the nine Baháʼí Holy Days.
- Risáliy-i-Nuṣús-i-Alváḥ dar báriy-i-Baqáy-i-Arváḥ, a collection of Baháʼí writings on the immortality of the human soul.
- Risáliy-i-Tasbíḥ va Tahlíl, a vocalized collection of Arabic prayers by Baháʼuʼlláh.
- Sharḥ-i-Ḥayát-i-Ḥaḍrat-i-Valíyy-i-Amru'lláh, a brief biography of Shoghi Effendi.
- Taqrírát dar báriy-i-Kitáb-i-Mustaṭáb-i-Aqdas, a transcribed verse-by-verse analysis of the Kitáb-i-Aqdas in Persian.
- Táríkh-i-Amríy-i-Hamadán, a history of the Baháʼí Faith in the city of Hamadán.
- Yádigár, transcribed oral remarks from Ishráq-Khávarí on various subjects.

== See also ==
- Mírzá Abu'l-Faḍl (1844–1914)
- Mírzá Asadu'llah Fádil Mázandarání (1881–1957)
- Adib Taherzadeh (1921–2000)
