= Gleanings from the Writings of Baháʼu'lláh =

Compilation of selected texts by Baháʼu'lláh

Gleanings from the Writings of Baháʼu'lláh is a compilation of selected tablets and extracts from tablets by Baháʼu'lláh, the founder of the Baháʼí Faith. Shoghi Effendi, Guardian of the Baháʼí Faith from 1921 to 1957, made the selection and performed the translation, which was first published in 1935.

The work consists of "a selection of the most characteristic and hitherto unpublished passages from the outstanding works of the Author of the Baháʼí Revelation," according to Shoghi Effendi. The passages come from the whole range of Baháʼu'lláh's writings, dated from about 1853 to 1892.

The book can be divided in five parts:

- The "Day of God" (sec. 1-18)
- The Manifestation of God (sec. 19-69)
- The soul and its immortality (sec. 70-99)
- The World Order and the Most Great Peace (sec. 100-121)
- The duties of the individual and the spiritual meaning of life (sec. 122-166)

Among others, passages from the following works are included:

- Epistle to the Son of the Wolf
- The Hidden Words
- The Kitáb-i-Aqdas
- The Kitáb-i-Íqán

In addition, works partially translated in Gleanings were published more completely in the following compilations:

- The Summons of the Lord of Hosts
- The Tabernacle of Unity
- Tablets of Baháʼu'lláh Revealed After the Kitáb-i-Aqdas

The book was published without a list of which passages were derived from which works of Baháʼu'lláh, but such a list has been reconstructed subsequently and is on the web.

Because of its broad selection, Gleanings is one of the first works of Baháʼu'lláh many people read. Rúḥíyyih Rabbání, Shoghi Effendi's widow, called it "a magnificent gift" to the Western Baháʼís. Queen Marie of Romania wrote that "even doubters would find a powerful strength in it, if they would read it alone, and would give their souls time to expand." The work has been translated into many languages.
