= Epistle to the Son of the Wolf =

Bahá'í text written in 1891

The Epistle to the Son of the Wolf is the last major work of Baháʼu'lláh, founder of the Baháʼí Faith, written in 1891 just before his death in 1892. It is a letter written to "the son of the Wolf," Shaykh Muhammad Taqi known as Áqá Najafi (1846–1914), a Muslim cleric in Isfáhán, where his family was the most powerful clerical family. Baháʼu'lláh called the father, Shaykh Muhammad Báqir (1819-1883), the Wolf because of his responsibility for the execution of the Nahrí brothers in Isfahan in 1879. The father and son were known for their persecution of the Baháʼís.

== Background ==
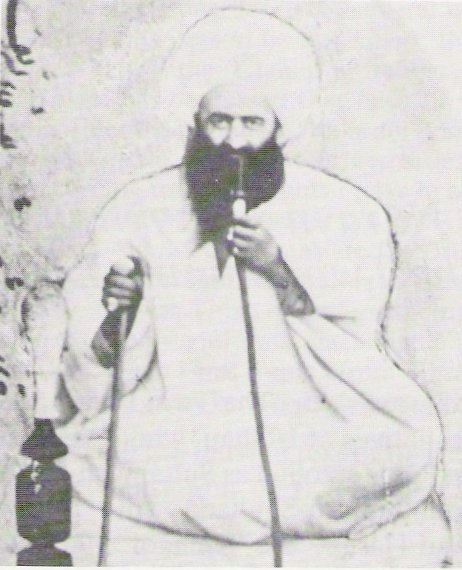
Shaykh Muhammad-Baqir, given the title of 'The Wolf'

In the book, Baháʼu'lláh admonishes Áqá Najafi ('Son of Wolf') and calls upon him to repent. His father Shaykh Muhammad Báqir, ('Wolf') and Mír Muḥammad Ḥusayn, the Imám Jum'ih of Isfahán, surnamed ('She-Serpent') were the conspirators against two brothers, Muhammad-Husayn Nahrí and Muhammad-Hasan Nahrí. The brothers came from an aristocratic and established mercantile family in Isfahan. The Imám-Jum'ih of the city owed the brothers money and – when the two asked for a payment – he devised a plan to rid his debt. After confronting Shaykh Muhammad-Baqir and Sultán-Mas'úd Mírzá, the son of Násiri'd-Dín Sháh of this issue, the three devised a plan to imprison the brothers on account of their Baháʼí Faith. The two brothers were subsequently arrested, paraded around Isfahan with crowds jeering abuse, and publicly executed in a humiliating manner. Baháʼu'lláh wrote several tablets lamenting the loss of the two brothers, and denouncing the treachery that provoked their murder. One such tablet, Lawh-i-Burhán, addressed to Shaykh Muhammad Báqir accuses him and his accomplice Mír Muḥammad Ḥusayn of the persecution of the Baháʼís.

Baháʼu'lláh was heartbroken by the death of the brothers – he had met the two whilst a prisoner in Adrianople. He eulogized the two, naming them the "King of Martyrs" and the "Beloved of Martyrs", and the "Twin Shining Lights".

== Content ==
In the Epistle to the Son of the Wolf, Baháʼu'lláh admonishes Shaykh Muḥammad-Taqí for having persecuted the Bahá’ís, quotes what Shoghi Effendi describes as "some of the most characteristic and celebrated passages of His own [earlier] writings," summarises his teachings, and presents arguments for the validity of his mission. As with several other Writings of Baháʼu'lláh, the Epistle is intended for an audience beyond its ostensible addressee, including the "people of the Bayán" (referring to Bábís who did not embrace his cause), the "people of Bahá" (referring to his own followers), and the "peoples of the earth".

The book also contains numerous autobiographical passages which recount events spanning from the period preceding his imprisonment in the Síyáh-Chál to the time of the book's composition in 1891, a year before Baháʼu'lláh's death. These events include his arrest in Níyávarán which preceded the imprisonment, the machinations against him by certain Persian officials in Constantinople, various misdeeds by partisans of Mírzá Yahyá as well as Yahyá himself, and his suggestion to a Turkish official, Kamál Páshá, almost three decades earlier that his government convene a gathering to plan for a universal auxiliary language and script.

=== Citation of earlier Writings of Baháʼu'lláh ===
The Epistle to the Son of the Wolf quotes extensively from Baháʼu'lláh's earlier works, including the Lawḥ-i-Burhán (which was addressed to Shaykh Muḥammad-Taqí's father, referred to by Baháʼu'lláh as "the Wolf"), the Hidden Words, the Súriy-i-Haykal (particularly his messages to Naser al-Din Shah Qajar, Napoleon III, Queen Victoria, and Czar Alexander II), the Kalimát-i-Firdawsíyyih ("Words of Paradise"), Bishárát ("Glad-Tidings"), Ishráqát ("Splendors"), Tajallíyát ("Effulgences"), as well as a number of Tablets which have been translated in Gleanings from the Writings of Baháʼu'lláh. It is for this reason that the book has been frequently described as an anthology selected by Baháʼu'lláh himself.

=== Crimson Book ===
In the Epistle to the Son of Wolf Baha'u'llah alluded to his own Will and Testament – the Kitáb-i-'Ahd – as the Crimson Book. In this document he named his son ʻAbdu'l-Bahá as his successor.
