= Kitáb-i-Badíʻ =

Book written by Baháʼu'lláh in 1867-68

The Kitáb-i-Badíʻ (Persian: كتاب بديع, lit. 'Wondrous Book'; Arabic: الكتاب البديع) is a book composed by Baháʼu'lláh, the founder of the Baháʼí Faith, in 1867–68 in Adrianople. Twice the size of the Kitáb-i-Íqán, it contains insights into the prophecies of the Báb concerning "He whom God shall make manifest" and was written in defence of the Baháʼí revelation. The work has not yet been translated into English.

== Background ==
The book was written in Persian but includes quotations from the Báb's writings in Arabic.

Mírzá Mihdíy-i-Rashtí, a supporter of Baháʼu'lláh's half-brother, Mírzá Yahyá, and his companion Siyyid Muhammad wrote a letter to Áqá Muhammad-'Alí, a companion of Baháʼu'lláh, containing various arguments against Baháʼu'lláh's claim to be 'He Whom God shall make manifest', whose advent was promised in the Báb's writings. Áqá Muhammad-'Alí presented the letter to Baháʼu'lláh, who composed the Kitáb-i-Badíʻ in response. As with many other works by Baháʼu'lláh, the entire text was dictated by Baháʼu'lláh, speaking in the voice of his amanuensis — in this case, Áqá Muhammad-'Alí.

== Contents of the book ==
Shoghi Effendi referred to the work as Baháʼu'lláh's "apologia, written to refute the accusations levelled against Him by Mírzá Mihdíy-i-Rashtí, corresponding to the Kitáb-i-Iqan, revealed in defense of the Bábí Revelation".

The book consists of short quotes from Mírzá Mihdí's letter followed by numerous pages refuting each argument. Baháʼu'lláh includes extensive quotations from the Báb's writings in support of his refutations. A major portion of the work is devoted to explaining the Báb's prophecies concerning 'Him Whom God shall make manifest'. He includes numerous quotations from the Báb's writings, such as the following (referring to 'Him Whom God shall make manifest'):

Were He to make of every one on earth a Prophet, all would, in very truth, be accounted as Prophets in the sight of God...In the day of the revelation of Him Whom God shall make manifest all that dwell on earth will be equal in His estimation. Whomsoever He ordaineth as a Prophet, he, verily, hath been a Prophet from the beginning that hath no beginning, and will thus remain until the end that hath no end, inasmuch as this is an act of God. And whosoever is made a Viceregent by Him, shall be a Viceregent in all the worlds, for this is an act of God. For the will of God can in no wise be revealed except through His will, nor His wish be manifested save through His wish. He, verily, is the All-Conquering, the All-Powerful, the All-Highest.

Baháʼu'lláh includes strong language concerning Mírzá Mihdíy-i-Rashtí, whom he refers to as the 'wicked one', 'the evil plotter', 'the impious', 'the impudent', 'the outcast', 'the faithless soul', 'the froward', and 'he who contends with God'. He also refers to Siyyid Muhammad in the text as 'one who joined partners with God', 'the prime mover of mischief', 'the embodiment of wickedness and impiety', and 'one accursed of God'. Baháʼu'lláh furthermore stigmatizes his half-brother, Mírzá Yahyá, as the idol of the Bábí community and accuses Siyyid Muhammad of disseminating Baháʼu'lláh's writings in his own name.

== See also ==
- Kitáb-i-Íqán (The Book of Certitude)
- Kitáb-i-Aqdas (The Most Holy Book)
- Gems of Divine Mysteries
- Baha'i Literature
