= Four valleys =

The term Four Valleys or Quatre-Vallées may refer to:

- The Four Valleys, a book by Bahá'u'lláh, the founder of the Bahá'í Faith
- Quatre-Vallées, a small province of France located in the southwest of France
- Quatre-Vallées, a ski area in Switzerland
