= Kitáb-i-Íqán =

Primary Baháʼí text, written by Baháʼu'lláh in 1861

The Kitáb-i-Íqán (Persian: كتاب ايقان, Arabic: كتاب الإيقان, lit. 'Book of Certitude'; from the Arabic íqán, "to know with certitude"), also known as the Book of Íqán or simply The Íqán, is a book by Baháʼu'lláh, the founder of the Baháʼí Faith, and one of the principal doctrinal works of that religion. The work was composed in Baghdad over two days in January 1861, written partly in Persian and in Arabic. The work was written in response to questions posed by Ḥájí Mírzá Siyyid Muḥammad, a maternal uncle of the Báb, concerning Shia expectations of the Islamic end times. Scholars of Islam have treated the work as a substantial piece of Persian-language Qurʼanic exegesis.

The Kitáb-i-Íqán sets out the foundational Baháʼí discourse on the unity of religions, the progressive nature of revelation, and the figurative reading of eschatological symbols.

Baháʼí sources treat the work as second in importance only to the Kitáb-i-Aqdas and as a complement to the Báb's Persian Bayán. Shoghi Effendi, who translated the book into English in 1931, wrote that it lays "a broad and unassailable foundation for the complete and permanent reconciliation" of the followers of the world's religions. In the academic study of religion the book has been read within the genre of Islamic Qurʼanic commentary (tafsír, Arabic: تفسير) and of Shiʻi eschatological hermeneutics. The work has been translated into over thirty languages.

== History ==
=== Origins and composition ===
The Kitáb-i-Íqán was composed by Baháʼu'lláh in 1861 while he was living as an exile in Baghdad, then part of the Ottoman Empire. The book was a response to questions posed by Ḥájí Mírzá Siyyid Muḥammad, a maternal uncle of the Báb who had not accepted his nephew's messianic claim. According to Christopher Buck, he submitted them at the urging of a Bábí relative, Mírzá Áqáy-i Núruʼd-Dín. In 1861, he travelled to Karbala, Iraq, to visit his brother, Ḥájí Mírzá Ḥasan-ʻAlí, and from there to Baghdad to meet Baháʼu'lláh. At Baháʼu'lláh's, invitation Muḥammad set out his questions in writing, on two sheets of paper under four headings: whether the Day of Resurrection would be a physical event, and how judgement will be passed to the righteous and the wicked; what to make of the reports that the Twelfth Imám had gone into hiding; how the interpretation of Islamic scripture could be aligned with the readings Bábís were giving it; and why the prophecies about the Qá'im, the prophet foretold in Shia traditions, were not fulfilled. The reply, containing over 200 pages, was completed within forty-eight hours.

The date of composition has been the subject of scholarly investigation: Ahang Rabbani's translation of a letter written by Muḥammad from Baghdad to his eldest son established it as mid-January 1861, superseding earlier estimates of 1861–62. The book was originally known as the Risálih-i-Khálúyih (Arabic: رسالة الخالوية, lit. 'Treatise for the Maternal Uncle'; also given as Risáliy-i Khál, "Epistle to the Uncle") and the Risálih-i-Istidláliyyih (Arabic: الرسالة الاستدلالية, lit. 'Treatise of Proofs'); Baháʼu'lláh later, while residing in ʻAkká, gave the work the title Íqán, "to know with certitude" in Arabic.

When Baháʼu'lláh composed the Kitáb-i-Íqán he had not yet publicly declared his own mission, which he would announce at the Garden of Ridván in 1863. Christopher Buck has likened this feature of the book to the "messianic secret" of the Gospel of Mark in the Christian New Testament.

=== Early circulation and reception ===
In the years immediately following its composition, the Kitáb-i-Íqán circulated widely in manuscript among the Bábí community of Iran. According to Smith, its prose was fluent and accessible to ordinary readers without formal religious education, and attracted many readers within the Bábí community toward Baháʼu'lláh. Smith credits the work with helping to revive a community devastated by the execution of the Báb in 1850 and the state persecution that followed. Together with other works of Baháʼu'lláh's decade-long Iraqi exile – including the Hidden Words, the Seven Valleys, the Four Valleys, and the Gems of Divine Mysteries – it is among the major writings of his Baghdad period, and addresses the doctrinal foundations of the new religion in a register distinct from the mystical, ethical, and metaphysical treatises of the same period. Within Bábí circles, the book served both to present and to defend the claims of the Báb, and to foster the renewal of the community.

=== Publication and translation ===
Christopher Buck suggests that the Kitáb-i-Íqán was probably the first work of Baháʼu'lláh to appear in print. Before it was lithographed, the book had circulated for some two decades in handwritten copies, and Baháʼu'lláh addressed the problem of defective manuscripts in tablets to his followers, editing the text in 1887–89 and entrusting an approved copy to Hají Ákhúnd, to which subsequent copies were to conform. An undated lithographed edition was produced in Bombay by the Báb's family, the Afnáns. No publisher is named on the surviving copy, and Buck attributes the printing to the Ḥasaní Zívar Press in about 1882. A second, dated lithograph followed in 1893 from the Afnáns' Náṣirí Press, in the calligraphy of Mishkín-Qalam. In the earlier lithograph the Qurʼanic verses had been quoted as inexact paraphrases, and Baháʼu'lláh instructed that they be matched to the standard Qurʼanic text. Critics of the Baháʼí Faith have used the inexact citations to argue that the book is not a revelation. Buck regards the differences as minor, attributes them to quotation from memory, and holds that they do not affect the book's argument. The first typeset edition was published in Cairo in 1900 by al-Mawsúʻát Press; the text in general use derives from a later Egyptian printing of 1933.

The work was first translated into English in 1904 by Ali Kuli Khan, assisted by Howard MacNutt – one of the first works of Baháʼu'lláh to appear in English. Shoghi Effendi, head of the Baháʼí Faith from 1921 to 1957, retranslated the work into English in 1931, and his rendering remains the standard English translation. An Arabic translation, prepared under the auspices of the National Spiritual Assembly of the Baháʼís of Egypt, was published in 1934. The Kitáb-i-Íqán has since appeared in over thirty languages, including Urdu, German, French, Spanish, Russian, and Chinese editions.

== Contents ==
The Kitáb-i-Íqán is divided into two principal parts: the first sets out the foundational discourse that, in Baháʼu'lláh's view, divine revelation is progressive and that the religions are interrelated, with each religion accepting the previous ones and, often in veiled terms, foretelling the arrival of the next prophet. Because the questioner was a Muslim, Baháʼu'lláh draws extensively upon verses of the Bible to argue that a Christian could interpret his own scriptures allegorically and arrive at belief in a subsequent religion. Baháʼu'lláh applies the same hermeneutic to a Muslim considering the claims of the Báb. The second and longer part addresses what the work presents as theological and rational proofs of the mission of the Báb. One passage of this section is known among Baháʼís as the "Tablet of the True Seeker."

Shoghi Effendi set out the book's themes as a list of fifteen items. On his account, the work proclaims "the existence and oneness of a personal God" and "the unity of the prophets"; treats religious truth as relative and revelation as continuous; interprets the figurative language of the New Testament, the verses of the Quran and the Islamic traditions that he held to have divided the followers of the world's religions; sets out the prerequisites for the true seeker; and defines the meaning of eschatological terms, among them Return, Resurrection, the Seal of the Prophets and the Day of Judgment.

=== Progressive revelation and the unity of religions ===
A central theme of the Kitáb-i-Íqán is the progressive succession and unity of the religions. The work holds that the reality of God is beyond human comprehension, and that through history God gradually manifests his names and attributes in accordance with the capacity and needs of human societies, by means of the prophets, or Manifestations of God (Persian: مظاهر ظهور, romanized: maẓáhir-i-ẓuhúr). The work distinguishes a twofold station of the Manifestations – a station of unity, in which they speak with a single voice, and a station of distinction, in which each is differentiated by his own historical mission. According to the Kitáb-i-Íqán, the Manifestations are the principal vehicles of humanity's spiritual education and social development.

=== Causes of the rejection of the prophets ===
Baháʼu'lláh argues in the Kitáb-i-Íqán that throughout the history of religion, one of the principal causes of the rejection of a new dispensation has been the religious scholars of the preceding dispensation, who – whether through failure to grasp their own scriptures or through fear of losing social standing – have opposed the new prophet and persecuted him. In his account, the failure to comprehend scriptural prophecy stems from a literalist reading of certain verses; the work draws on the long-standing distinction in Islamic hermeneutics between the outward (Arabic: ظاهر, romanized: ẓáhir) and inward (Arabic: باطن, romanized: báṭin) senses of scripture, while stopping short of the bátiní position that symbolic readings may override plainly literal texts. Baháʼu'lláh maintains that many verses of scripture are symbolic and ought not to be construed literally. In illustration, the work cites Christian expectation that the second coming of Christ will be accompanied by the falling of stars and his bodily descent on the clouds (Matthew 24:29–31), and Muslim expectation that the Day of Resurrection will be marked by the bodily raising of the dead and other physical disruptions. The book reads many of the ambiguous verses of the Quran (the mutashabihat), passages of the Gospels, and Islamic traditions allegorically, expounding terms such as the Return, the Seal of the Prophets, the Day of Recompense, and the Day of Resurrection.

Baháʼu'lláh further argues that mistaken human criteria and expectations are an additional cause of the rejection of the prophets. In his analysis, believers tend to expect the Promised One to come with worldly power and outward dominion – as in the expectations of the Shia concerning the Mahdí, or of the Jews concerning the Messiah – whereas the relevant verses, on his reading, signify spiritual rather than political sovereignty. The work argues that human standards do not constrain the divine will, citing as instances God's choice of Moses, who had committed homicide, and of Jesus, the account of whose birth was disbelieved by his contemporaries; the command to Muhammad to change the qibla from Jerusalem to the Kaaba in Mecca; and the overturning of established customs. In every age, Baháʼu'lláh contends, such acts have tested the people of the time and led many to turn away.

=== Resurrection and the Day of Judgment ===
According to the Kitáb-i-Íqán, the Resurrection or end times does not consist in physical disruption of the cosmos but begins with the call of a new prophet – the moment at which the era of the former religion comes to an end and a new era is inaugurated. Baháʼu'lláh's argument on this point turns on the Qurʼanic promise of "attainment unto the divine Presence" (liqáʼ Alláh): reading Verse 44 of Al-Aḥzāb (Q.33, Arabic: الأحزاب, lit. 'the confederates') alongside the "Seal of the Prophets" verse four verses earlier (Q. 33:40). Baháʼu'lláh argues that a literal meeting with God in the end times is impossible, and that the promise must therefore signify the encounter with God's messenger for that age. On this reading, the followers of the previous dispensation are subject to a spiritual judgment by virtue of their acceptance or rejection of the new prophet, and resurrection is the attainment of new spiritual life through that acceptance. Buck has called this re-reading of eschatology the work's "most original and dramatic" act of Qurʼanic interpretation; Saiedi has characterized it as a "revolution in Islamic theology" that repositions revelation within history.

=== Verification of the mission of the Báb ===
The Kitáb-i-Íqán presents arguments for the Qá'imí claim of the Báb (Sayyid ʻAlí Muḥammad) and seeks to reconcile that claim with Shia expectations. Baháʼu'lláh draws a parallel between his contemporaries' rejection of the Báb and the earlier rejections of Christ and of Muhammad by their respective communities. The work also enumerates what it presents as proofs of the validity of a prophetic claim, which Baháʼu'lláh holds to be fulfilled in the Báb: the person of the prophet himself; the verses he put forward as scripture; his constancy in proclaiming the new dispensation despite opposition; his transformative effect on his followers; the steadfastness of those followers and their readiness to give their lives for his teachings; and the fulfillment of prophecy concerning the supremacy and sovereignty of the Promised One. The book cites several Shia hadiths in which the Qá'im is described not as an outwardly victorious figure but as one rejected and afflicted, whose followers will be severely persecuted; recounting the suffering and crucifixion of Christ alongside what Baháʼu'lláh presents as his subsequent spiritual triumph, Baháʼu'lláh argues for the possibility of the Báb's spiritual victory in spite of his long imprisonment and eventual execution.

Juan Cole writes that Baháʼu'lláh cites Jesus in the work as a Manifestation of God who possessed neither wealth nor worldly honor, and points to figures revered in Shia Islam who suffered affliction in this world – above all Imam Ḥusayn, grandson of Muhammad, killed by the Umayyad government in 680. Cole argues that because Shia tradition already possessed an elaborate theology of redemptive sacrifice centred on Ḥusayn, Baháʼu'lláh was able to combine that tradition with Christian preaching about the crucifixion, and that the passion of Christ in turn served to interpret the execution of the Báb.

=== Conditions of the true seeker ===
In a section known among Baháʼís as the "Tablet of the True Seeker," Baháʼu'lláh sets out moral prerequisites that the seeker must possess in order to grasp the mysteries of the resurrection and to recognize the divine messenger of his own age; Buck reads the passage as linking moral purity to clear spiritual insight, and situates it within Baháʼu'lláh's wider concern for the moral consolidation of the Bábí community after the persecutions of 1848–52. Todd Lawson has situated the passage within the broader Islamicate tradition of mystical poetry and ethics (Arabic: أدب, romanized: adab), describing its deployment of Sufi imagery – the lover in pursuit of the Beloved, the fragrance of God perceived from afar, and the attainment of spiritual stations – and its use of the conventions of Persian devotional literature. Among the qualities the work enumerates are, in its own terms, inner purification and clarity of heart; detachment from transient worldly affairs; the independent investigation of truth in place of blind imitation; trust in God, humility, restraint from idle speech, and contentment; abstention from backbiting; charity and kindness to animals; reciprocity; and a disposition to forgive rather than to judge.

Saiedi reads the passage as a compact statement of Baháʼí moral and mystical anthropology, and as a bridge between the doctrinal argument of the work and the practical demands it places on its reader.

== Style and rhetorical form ==
The Kitáb-i-Íqán is composed in Persian prose interspersed with substantial passages of Arabic, particularly in citation of the Quran and of Islamic hadith. Todd Lawson characterizes the work as "primarily a work of exegesis" and locates it within a broader Bábí–Baháʼí hermeneutical tradition that he has elsewhere termed "interpretation as revelation."

Christopher Buck reads Baháʼu'lláh's method as working in two stages: first arguing that the Quran's eschatological verses are meant figuratively, then interpreting them symbolically (Arabic: تأويل, romanized: ta'wíl). On Buck's reading, Baháʼu'lláh repeatedly ties each symbol to the meaning he gives it by means of a Persian grammatical construction, the metaphorical genitive (Persian: اضافه استعاری, romanized: iḍáfay-i isti‘árí).

Nader Saiedi has analyzed the work's rhetorical structure as a recursive pattern of question, scriptural citation, hermeneutical reframing, and moral application. Buck argues that the exegetical principles of Akhbárí Shiʻi tafsír – the tradition-based school that grounds interpretation in reports from the Imáms – are plainly at work in the Kitáb-i-Íqán, while holding that the interpretive strategies themselves are "amply attested in the classical Sunní heritage", which had long influenced Shiʻi practice; on his reading Baháʼu'lláh invokes the Akhbárí exegetical agenda not to validate Shia tradition but to break from it. Edward Granville Browne described the book as "a work of high merit, of vigorous style, lucid in argument".

== Significance ==
The Kitáb-i-Íqán is one of the principal doctrinal works of Baháʼu'lláh.

In academic study of the Bábí–Baháʼí tradition, Christopher Buck has framed the Íqán as the "messianic secret" of Baháʼu'lláh's writings and as a sustained piece of inter-religious Qurʼanic commentary, and has proposed that its international audience makes it "the world's most influential Qurʼán commentary outside the Muslim world." Nader Saiedi has read the work as a revolution in Islamic theology, re-positioning the relationship between revelation, eschatology, and history; and Juan Cole has situated it within the broader nineteenth-century Middle Eastern engagement with religious modernity. Earlier Western scholarly responses came from E. G. Browne, whose Cambridge studies of the Bábí and Baháʼí movements drew sustained attention to the work in the late nineteenth and early twentieth centuries.

Shoghi Effendi described the work as "a model of Persian prose, of a style at once original, chaste and vigorous, and remarkably lucid," and wrote that it "occupies a position unequalled by any work in the entire range of Baháʼí literature, except the Kitáb-i-Aqdas." Within the Baháʼí community the book is used in study classes and devotional reading, and Hooper Dunbar and Fazel Naghdy have published study guides to it.

== See also ==
- Kitáb-i-Badíʻ
- Gems of Divine Mysteries
- Some Answered Questions
- Writings of Baháʼu'lláh
- Baháʼí literature
