= The Seven Valleys =

Baháʼí mystical text, written in Persian by Baháʼu'lláh

The Seven Valleys (Persian: هفت وادی Haft-Vádí) is a book written in Persian by Baháʼu'lláh, the founder of the Baháʼí Faith. The Seven Valleys follows the structure of the Persian poem The Conference of the Birds.

The Seven Valleys is usually published together with The Four Valleys (Persian: چهار وادی Chahár Vádí), which was also written by Baháʼu'lláh, under the title The Seven Valleys and the Four Valleys. The two books are distinctly different and have no direct relation. In February 2019 an authorized translation of both titles and some others was published by the Baháʼí World Centre in the collection The Call of the Divine Beloved.

== Background ==
The Seven Valleys was written after March 1856, probably around 1857-1858 in Baghdad after Baháʼu'lláh had returned from the Sulaymaniyah region in Iraqi Kurdistan where he spent two years anonymously with various Sufi sheikhs using the pseudonym Darvish Muhammad-i-Irani. The work was written in response to questions posed by Shaykh Muhyi'd-Din, a judge, who was a follower of the Qádiríyyih Order of Sufism. About the time of writing to Baháʼu'lláh, he quit his job, and spent the rest of his life wandering around Iraqi Kurdistan.

The style of The Seven Valleys is highly poetic, though not composed in verse. Nearly every line of the text contains rhymes and plays on words, which can be lost in translation. As the recipient was of Sufi origin, Baháʼu'lláh used historical and religious subtleties which sometimes used only one or a few words to refer to Qurʼanic verses, traditions, and well-known poems. In English, frequent footnotes are used to convey certain background information.

== Content ==
The book follows the path of the soul on a spiritual journey passing through different stages, from this world to other realms which are closer to God, as first described by the 12th Century Sufi poet Farid al-Din Attar in his Conference of the Birds. Baháʼu'lláh in the work explains the meanings and the significance of the seven stages. In the introduction, Baháʼu'lláh says "Some have called these Seven Valleys, and others, Seven Cities." The stages are accomplished in order, and the goal of the journey is to follow "the Right Path", "abandon the drop of life and come to the sea of the Life-Bestower", and "gaze on the Beloved". In the conclusion of the book, he mentions:

"These journeys have no visible ending in the world of time, but the severed wayfarer—if invisible confirmation descend upon him and the Guardian of the Cause assist him—may cross these seven stages in seven steps, nay rather in seven breaths, nay rather in a single breath, if God will and desire it."

=== The Valley of Search ===
The valley of search is described as the first step that a seeker must take in his path. Baháʼu'lláh states that the seeker must cleanse his heart, and not follow the paths of his forefathers. It is explained that ardour and patience are required to traverse this valley.

=== The Valley of Love ===
The next valley is the "Valley of Love". Baháʼu'lláh describes how love burns away reason, causing pain, madness and single minded endeavour. He writes that the fire of love burns away the material self, revealing instead the world of the spirit.

=== The Valley of Knowledge ===
The knowledge referred to in this valley is the knowledge of God, and not one based on learning; it is explained that pride in one's knowledge and accomplishments often disallows one to reach true understanding, which is the knowledge of God. It is explained that the seeker, when in this valley, begins to understand the mysteries contained within God's revelation, and finds wisdom in all things including when faced with pain and hardship, which he understands to be God's mercy and blessing. This valley is called the last limited valley.

=== The Valley of Unity ===
The next stage is the valley of unity, and it is explained that the seeker now sees creation not by its limitations, but sees the attributes of God in all created things. The seeker, it is written, is detached from earthly things, is not concerned with his own self and has no ego; instead he praises God for all of creation.

=== The Valley of Contentment ===
The next valley for the seeker is the valley of contentment, where it is explained that the seeker becomes independent from all things, and even though he may look poor or is subjected to suffering, he will be endowed with wealth and power from the spiritual worlds and will inwardly be happy. Happiness is explained to be the attribute of the true believer, and it cannot be achieved by obtaining material things, since material things are transitory.

=== The Valley of Wonderment ===
In the valley of wonderment the seeker, it is written, is struck dumb (mute) by the beauty of God; the seeker becomes conscious of the vastness and glory of creation, and discovers the inner mysteries of God's revelation. Being led from one mystery of creation to the next, it is explained that the seeker continues to be astonished by the works of God.

=== The Valley of True Poverty and Absolute Nothingness ===
The final valley is the valley of true poverty and absolute nothingness, and it is the furthermost state that the mystic can reach. The seeker is poor of all material things, and is rich in spiritual attributes. It is explained that it is the state of annihilation of self in God, but not an existential union: the essences of God's self and the mystic's self remain distinct, in contrast to what appears to be a complete union in other traditions.

== Commentary in later Baháʼí writings ==
ʻAbdu'l-Bahá explained in one of his talks that The Seven Valleys is a guide for human conduct, that one should search out one's "own imperfections and not think of the imperfections of anybody else", to "strive to be free from imperfections" and that "nothing is more fruitful for man than the knowledge of his own shortcomings". Shoghi Effendi called The Seven Valleys Baháʼu'lláh's "greatest mystical composition."

== Translations ==
The Seven Valleys was one of the earliest available books of Baháʼu'lláh in European languages, first translated directly into French in 1905 and into English in 1906.

== See also ==
- The Four Valleys
- Gems of Divine Mysteries (several of the same valleys and others)
- Kitáb-i-Íqán (several of the same themes)
- Diwan (poetry)
- Layla and Majnun
- Arcs of Descent and Ascent
- Conference of the Birds
