= Núrayn-i-Nayyirayn =

Two Iranian Bahá'ís, brothers

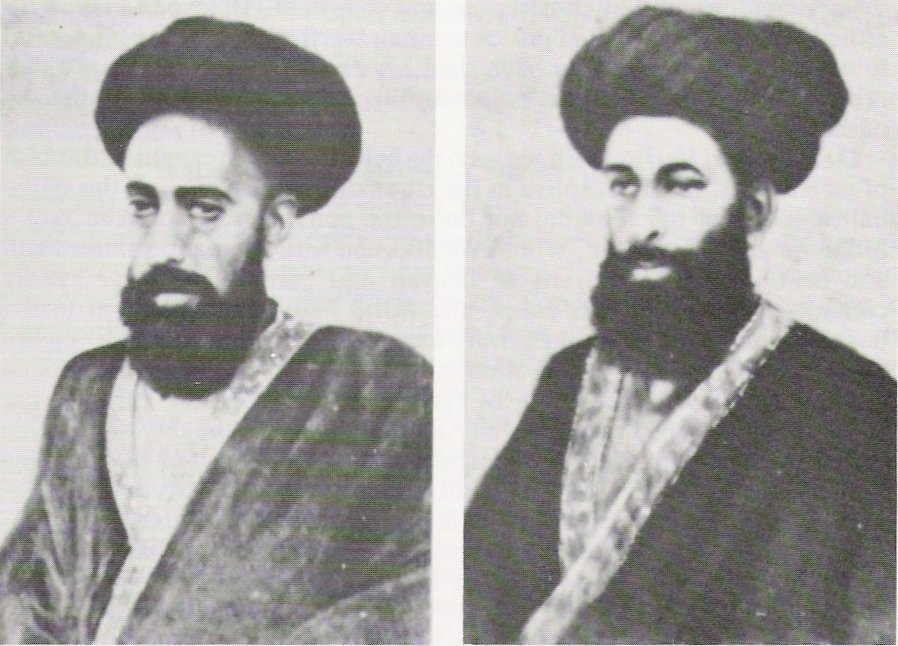
King of Martyrs (left), and Beloved of Martyrs (right)

Núrayn-i-Nayyirayn (Arabic: نورين نيران, meaning "twin shining lights") are two brothers who were followers of Baháʼu'lláh, the founder of the Baháʼí Faith, a global religion of Persian origin. They were beheaded in 1879 as a result of being Baháʼís. Numerous letters and tablets were written in their honour by Baháʼu'lláh, who gave them the titles for which they are commonly known: the King of Martyrs and the Beloved of Martyrs.

The older brother was Mírzá Muhammad-Husayn, given the title Mahbúbu's͟h-S͟huhadáʼ (Beloved of Martyrs). His brother was Mírzá Muhammad-Hasan, given the title Sultánu's͟h-S͟huhadaʼ (King of Martyrs). The latter was identified as one of the nineteen Apostles of Baháʼu'lláh.

The two were both natives of Isfahan, and were both rich and highly endowed with trading acumen. They were beheaded in the city of Isfahan in 1879 as a result of three persons: Mir Muhammad-Husayn, the Imám-Jum'ih of Isfahan; Shaykh Muhammad-Baqir, another influential Muslim cleric of Isfahan; and Sultán-Mas'úd Mírzá, the son of Násiri'd-Dín Sháh, who governed Isfahan during the time.

== Background ==
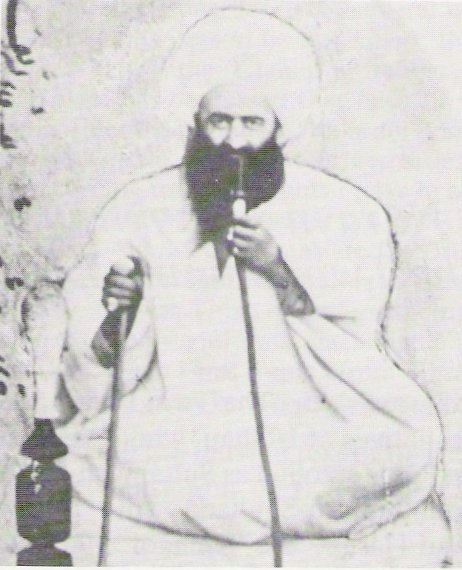
Shaykh Muhammad-Baqir, given the title of 'The Wolf'

The brothers followed in the footsteps of their father, Mírzá Ibráhím. For years, they had helped the Imám-Jum'ih manage his affairs, making several payments on his behalf, which became quite a substantial amount.

The brothers were merchants, and participated in a trading network with the Afnán (relatives of the Báb), who had a vast and profitable network stretching from Hong Kong to the Caucasus as well as Dutchman Johan Colligan. The two brothers were well known to be selfless, upright and kindly men. Part of their success as merchants has been attributed to their record of honest and upright transactions.

When they asked for the money which the Imám owed them, he stalled, and began to find ways to evade the payment. He met with Shaykh Muhammad-Baqir, another influential Islamic leader, and they created a plan to destroy the two of them. They approached Sultan-Mas'ud Mirza, the governor of Isfahan, and he quickly agreed to have them thrown in jail, on the grounds that they were Baháʼís.

== Martyrdom ==
Sultan-Mas'ud Mirza, governor of Isfahan

The two brothers were tortured, and promised release upon recanting their faith and cursing its leaders, which they never did. The collaborators wrote a letter to the Shah in Tehran, informing him that they had "in their concern for the security of the sovereign", detained and imprisoned two Baháʼís, and requested his permission to have them put to death. The Shah refused the request, and instead asked them to be sent as prisoners to Tehran. This was despite Dutchman Johan Colligan's testifying to their innocence.

The Ulama then decided that the brothers would likely be set free due to their innocence. They then decided to ensure their death before departing for Tehran. They used their power as religious leaders to encourage over 50 other divines, each with his crowd of rioters, to approach the house of the governor and demand the death of the brothers, chanting "Oh for our Religion!"

The governor argued with the Ulama that the two brothers were not guilty of any treasonable act and had done nothing hostile to the State. He refused to give orders for their execution. One of the Ulama then offered to kill them with his own hands. A large sum of money was offered to the governor, which he accepted. Before the orders could be carried out, a crowd broke into the prison holding them and dragged them into the street, where they were torn apart.

Rope were fastened to the corpses, and they were then dragged around the city and left at the gallows, where people continued to throw stones at them. At the close of the day, their bodies were taken to an archway, which was brought down over them. The date was March 17, 1879. They were eventually buried in the Takht-i-Fulad cemetery.

== Aftermath ==
Baháʼu'lláh wrote several tablets lamenting over the loss of the two brothers, and denouncing the treachery that provoked their murder. One such tablet, Lawh-i-Burhán, was addressed to Shaykh Muhammad Báqir, giving him the title of the 'Wolf', and the title of 'She-Serpent' to Muhammad Husayn, the Imám Jum'ih of Isfahán. The two, along with the governor of Isfahan were the three main conspirators against the brothers. Baháʼu'lláh also wrote the Epistle to the Son of the Wolf to the son of Shaykh Muhammad Báqir.

Mírzá Muhammad-Hasan left behind a widow named Fátimih Begum, and a son named Mírzá ʻAbdu'l-Husayn. Baháʼu'lláh directed them to come to Akka so that they might be compensated for all that had passed. Mírzá ʻAbdu'l-Husayn, died in the city. (Memorials of the Faithful, pg. 173) The third of ʻAbdu'l-Bahá's four surviving daughters, Rúhá Khánum, married Mírzá Jalál, another son of the King of Martyrs. She broke the Covenant in the 1940s.
