= Todd Lawson =

Professor of Islamic Thought

Professor Todd Lawson
- Occupations: Emeritus Professor for Islamic Thought and Middle Eastern studies

Academic background
- Education: McGill University
- Thesis: The Qur'an Commentary of Sayyid 'Alí Muhammad, the Báb (1987)
- Doctoral advisor: Hermann Landolt

Academic work
- Discipline: Islamic and Middle Eastern studies
- Main interests: Islam, Bahá'í Faith, Bábism, Shaykhism
- Website: https://toddlawson.ca/

Todd Lawson is an Emeritus Professor of Islamic thought at the University of Toronto.

== Biography ==
Todd Lawson specializes in Islamic Thought, specifically Shi'i Quran commentary and philosophical theology. He is associate professor emeritus at the University of Toronto and lives in Montreal. He obtained his BA in English Literature from the University of British Columbia, and his MA and PhD in Islamic studies from McGill University (1980 & 1987). His current research is focussed on the centrality and nature of metaphor in religious language or "revelation".

== Works ==
- Being Human: Bahá’í Perspectives on Islam, Modernity, and Peace (Kalimat Press 2020)
- Tafsir as Mystical Experience: Intimacy and Ecstasy in Quran Commentary (Brill 2018)
- The Quran: Epic and Apocalypse (Oneworld Academic 2017)
- Roads to Paradise: Eschatology and Concepts of the Hereafter in Islam (co-edited with Sebastian Guenther, Brill 2017)
- Baha’i History: A Special Issue of the Journal of Religious History (2012)
- A Most Noble Pattern: Collected Essays on the Writings of the Báb,`Alí Muhammad Shirazi (1819-1850) (George Ronald 2012)
- Gnostic Apocalypse and Islam: Qur'an, Exegesis, Messianism, and the Literary Origins of the Babi Religion (Routledge 2012)
- The Crucifixion and the Qur’an: A Study in the History of Muslim Thought (Oneworld 2009)
- Reason and Inspiration in Islam: Theology, Philosophy and Mysticism in Muslim Thought (I. B. Tauris 2005)

== See also ==
- Author's website toddlawson.ca
