= Mírzá Asadu'llah Fádil Mázandarání =

Iranian Baháʼí scholar

Mírzá Asadu'lláh Fádil Mázandarání
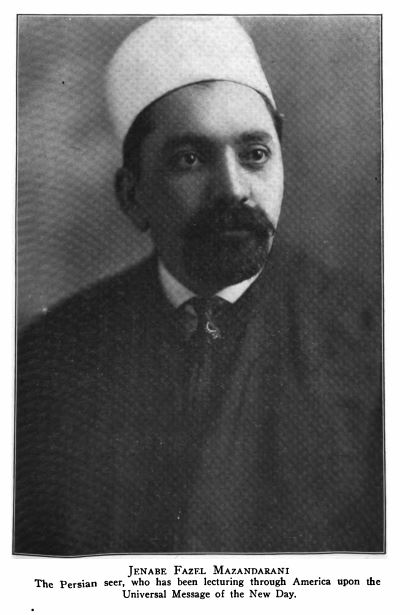

Mírzá Asadu'lláh Fádil Mázandarání (1881–1957) was a prominent Baháʼí scholar in Iran. He travelled to Iraq, India and North America at the request of ʻAbdu'l-Bahá and Shoghi Effendi (the second and third leaders of the Baháʼí Faith), to spread the Baháʼí teachings.

He had three sons, two from first marriage and one from second marriage.

== Works ==
He wrote the Zuhúru'l-Haqq (History of the Manifestation of Truth), a nine volume history of the Bábí and Baháʼí religions and the Asráru'l-áthár (1932-1943),. a five volume Bábí-Baháʼí dictionary (1967-1972). He has also published a four volume collection called Amr wa khalq, containing selections from the Bahá'í writings related to philosophical, theological, religious, and administrative matters (1954-1974).

== See also ==
- Mírzá Abu'l-Faḍl (1844–1914)
- ʻAbdu'l-Hamíd Ishráq-Khávari (1902–1972)
- Adib Taherzadeh (1921–2000)
