= Hidden Words =

Baháʼí scripture, written by Baháʼu'lláh around 1858

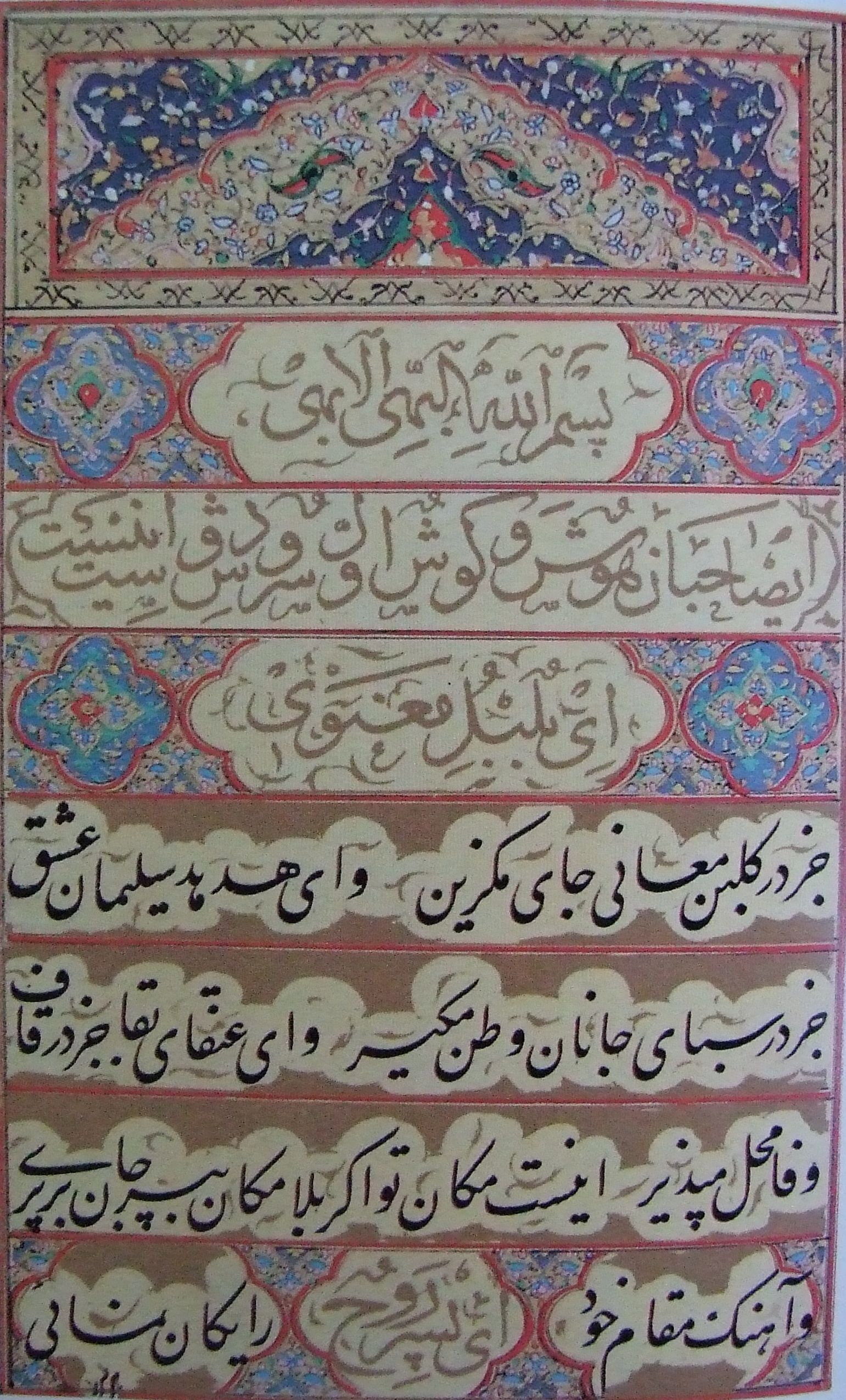
A page from the Hidden Words by calligrapher Mishkín-Qalam

The Hidden Words (Kalimát-i-Maknúnih, Arabic: کلمات مكنونة, Persian: کلمات مکنونه) is a book written by Baháʼu'lláh, the founder of the Baháʼí Faith, around 1858. He composed it while walking along the banks of the Tigris river during his exile in Baghdad. The book is written partly in Arabic and partly in Persian.

The Hidden Words is written in the form of a collection of 153 short aphorisms, 71 in Arabic and 82 in Persian, in which Baháʼu'lláh says he has taken the basic essence of certain spiritual truths and written them in brief form. ʻAbdu'l-Bahá, Baháʼu'lláh's son and the authorized interpreter of his teachings, advised Baháʼís to read them every day and every night and to implement their latent wisdom into their daily lives. He also said that The Hidden Words is "a treasury of divine mysteries" and that when one ponders its contents, "the doors of the mysteries will open".

== History ==
There is a Shiʻa Muslim tradition called "Mushaf of Fatimah" (Arabic: مصحف فاطمة), which speaks of Fatimah upon the death of her father, Muhammad. There are several versions of this tradition, but common to all are that the angel Gabriel appeared to her and consoled her by telling her things that she wrote in a book. According to one tradition they were prophesies. The book, if ever physical, did not survive, and was seen to be something that the Mahdi would reveal in the last days.

Baháʼís believe that The Hidden Words was revealed by Baháʼu'lláh in fulfillment of this tradition. Baháʼu'lláh originally named the book The Book of Fatimah (Arabic: صحیفة فاطمیّه), though he later referred to it in its modern appellation. This aspect of fulfillment corresponds with the Baháʼí beliefs that end times prophesies of all the world's religions are to be interpreted mystically and metaphorically. This puts the Baháʼí understanding of what Gabriel revealed to Fatimah somewhat at odds with the Shiʻa traditions.

According to Jonah Winters, there have been more translations of The Hidden Words than of any other Bahá'í text. It was first translated in 1894, meaning it was one of the first books of Bahá'í scripture to be translated into English. The current official translation by Shoghi Effendi was the result of a process of drafts beginning in 1923 and ending with a final revision in 1954.

== Text ==
The text of The Hidden Words has 153 passages divided into two sections: one in Arabic and the other in Persian. Each consists of a series of short, numbered passages. The Arabic has 71 passages and the Persian has 82.

Each passage begins with an invocation, many of which repeat. Some common invocations include "O Son of Spirit", "O Son of Man", and "O Son of Being". Baháʼí prayers are written in the first person of humanity, so that the reader can feel like they are having a conversation with God. The Hidden Words are written in the first person of God, so that the reader feels like God is speaking to them.

=== Introduction ===
From the Arabic, the following is the introduction written by Baháʼu'lláh:

"HE IS THE GLORY OF GLORIES
This is that which hath descended from the realm of glory, uttered by the tongue of power and might, and revealed unto the Prophets of old. We have taken the inner essence thereof and clothed it in the garment of brevity, as a token of grace unto the righteous, that they may stand faithful unto the Covenant of God, may fulfill in their lives His trust, and in the realm of spirit obtain the gem of Divine virtue."

=== Samples ===
From the Arabic

1. "O SON OF SPIRIT!
My first counsel is this: Possess a pure, kindly and radiant heart, that thine may be a sovereignty ancient, imperishable and everlasting.

7. "O SON OF MAN!
If thou lovest Me, turn away from thyself; and if thou seekest My pleasure, regard not thine own; that thou mayest die in Me and I may eternally live in thee."

49. "O SON OF MAN!
The true lover yearneth for tribulation even as doth the rebel for forgiveness and the sinful for mercy."

From the Persian

3. "O FRIEND!
In the garden of thy heart plant naught but the rose of love, and from the nightingale of affection and desire loosen not thy hold. Treasure the companionship of the righteous and eschew all fellowship with the ungodly."

12. "O MAN OF TWO VISIONS!
Close one eye and open the other. Close one to the world and all that is therein, and open the other to the hallowed beauty of the Beloved."

27. "O SON OF DUST!
All that is in heaven and earth I have ordained for thee, except the human heart, which I have made the habitation of My beauty and glory; yet thou didst give My home and dwelling to another than Me; and whenever the manifestation of My holiness sought His own abode, a stranger found He there, and, homeless, hastened unto the sanctuary of the Beloved. Notwithstanding I have concealed thy secret and desired not thy shame."

=== Ending ===
After the last passage, Baháʼu'lláh wrote:

"The mystic and wondrous Bride, hidden ere this beneath the veiling of utterance, hath now, by the grace of God and His divine favor, been made manifest even as the resplendent light shed by the beauty of the Beloved. I bear witness, O friends! that the favor is complete, the argument fulfilled, the proof manifest and the evidence established. Let it now be seen what your endeavors in the path of detachment will reveal. In this wise hath the divine favor been fully vouchsafed unto you and unto them that are in heaven and on earth. All praise to God, the Lord of all Worlds."

== See also ==
- Kitáb-i-Aqdas ("The Most Holy Book")
- Kitáb-i-Íqán ("The Book of Certitude")
- Gleanings from the Writings of Baháʼu'lláh
- Writings of Baháʼu'lláh
- Baháʼí literature
