= The Four Valleys =

Baháʼí mystical text, written in Persian by Baháʼu'lláh

The Four Valleys (Persian: چهار وادی Chahár Vádí) is a book written in Persian by Baháʼu'lláh, the founder of the Baháʼí Faith. The Seven Valleys (Persian: هفت وادی Haft-Vádí) was also written by Baháʼu'lláh, and the two books are usually published together under the title The Seven Valleys and the Four Valleys. The two books are distinctly different and have no direct relation.

In February 2019 an authorized translation of both titles was published by the Baháʼí World Centre in the collection The Call of the Divine Beloved.

== Background ==
The Four Valleys was written after March 1856 in Baghdad. Baháʼu'lláh had recently returned from the mountains of Kurdistan where he had spent two years studying with various Sufi sheikhs using the pseudonym Darvish Muhammad-i-Irani. The Four Valleys was written in response to questions of S͟hayk͟h ʻAbdu'r-Rahman-i-Talabani, the "honored and indisputable leader" of the Qádiríyyih Order of Sufism. He never identified as a Baháʼí, but was known to his followers as having high respect and admiration for Baháʼu'lláh.

=== Vocabulary ===
There is some difficulty in translating a text written in a poetic style, with references to concepts of Sufism that may be foreign in the West. Some names are left in their original Arabic form. For example, Maqsúd ("the Intended One") in this book is used in connection with the Kaaba in Mecca and serves as an adjective for it, i.e., it means "the intended Kaba", however, from the context it is clear that this is not a physical place but rather one of the stations on the path toward God.

Throughout the book Baháʼu'lláh exhorts men to education, goodly character and divine virtues.

In the book, Baháʼu'lláh describes the qualities and grades of four types of mystical wayfarers: "Those who progress in mystic wayfaring are of four kinds."

The four are, roughly:

- Those who journey through strict observance of religious laws.
- Those who journey to God through the use of logic and reason.
- Those who journey purely by the love of God.
- Those who journey by combination of the three approaches of obedience, reason, and inspiration.

This last is considered the highest or truest form of mystic union.

== See also ==
- The Seven Valleys
