= Gems of Divine Mysteries =

Arabic epistle by Baháʼu'lláh, founder of the Baháʼí Faith

Gems of Divine Mysteries (Jawáhiru'l-Asrár, Arabic: جواهر الاسرار) is a lengthy Arabic epistle by Baháʼu'lláh, the founder of the Baháʼí Faith. The tablet (as Baháʼu'lláh's works are often called) was written during his time in Baghdad (1853-1863) in Arabic, and was published in English in 2002.

== Background ==
The work was written in reply to a question from Siyyid Yúsuf-i-Sidihí Isfahání, a religious leader of the Shiʻas in Najaf, who had asked the question of how the promised Mahdi—a messianic figure in Islamic belief, expected to appear at the end of time—could have been "transformed" into Ali-Muhammad, known to Bahais as the Báb. The work was written on the same day as the question had been received and delivered through an intermediary.

According to a compilation published in 2000 by researchers at the Wilmette Institute, Siyyid Yúsuf-i-Sidihí Isfahání, who was residing in Karbila when the tablet was written, recognized the divinity of Baháʼu'lláh after reading the tablet. When he met Baháʼu'lláh later, he became a Babi. His friends rejected him for becoming a Babi and he could no longer stay in their home.

== Contents ==
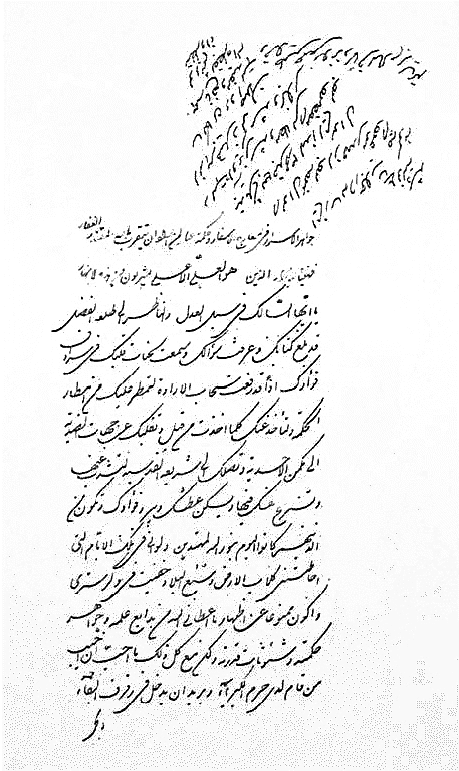
First page of the Javáhiru'l-Asrár, with an added note in Baháʼu'lláh's handwriting

Baháʼu'lláh himself states that he took "the opportunity provided by" the question "to elaborate on a number of subjects". The introduction of the published English translation lists some of these topics, some of which are: "rejection of the Prophets of the past," "danger of a literal reading of scripture," "the meaning of the signs and portents of the Bible concerning the advent of the new Manifestation," "the continuity of divine revelation," "intimations of Baháʼu'lláh's approaching declaration," and the significance or meanings of terms such as "Day of Judgement" and "the Resurrection."

Similar themes as those presented in the Gems of Divine Mysteries can be found in the Seven Valleys and in the Kitáb-i-Íqán.

== Translation ==
The governing body of the Baha'i Faith global community, the Universal House of Justice, announced in April 2001, as part of its ongoing five-year plan, that the Centre for the Study of the Texts — at the Baháʼí World Centre — would "focus on translations into English from the Holy Texts." The publication of Gems of Divine Mysteries was one of the projects undertaken in fulfilment of that five-year plan.

== See also ==
- Jabulqa and Jabulsa
