= Kitáb-i-Aqdas =

1873 Baháʼí religious text by Baháʼu'lláh

The Kitáb-i-Aqdas (Persian: [keˈtɒːb e æɢdæs], lit. 'The Most Holy Book') is the central religious text of the Baháʼí Faith, written by Baháʼu'lláh, the founder of the religion, in 1873. Though it is the main source of Baháʼí laws and practices, much of the content deals with other matters, like foundational principles of the religion, the establishment of Baháʼí institutions, mysticism, ethics, social principles, and prophecies. In Baháʼí literature it is described as "the Mother-Book" of the Baháʼí teachings, and the "Charter of the Future World Civilization".

Baháʼu'lláh had manuscript copies sent to Baháʼís in Iran some years after its writing in 1873, and in 1890–91 (1308 AH, 47 BE) he arranged for its first publication in Bombay, India. Parts of the text were translated into English by Shoghi Effendi, which, along with a Synopsis and Codification, were published in 1973 by the Universal House of Justice on the centennial anniversary of its writing. The full authoritative English translation, along with clarifying texts from Baháʼu'lláh and detailed explanatory notes from the Universal House of Justice, was first published in 1992.

== Etymology ==
The work was written in Arabic under the Arabic title al-Kitāb al-Aqdas (Arabic: الكتاب الأقدس), but in English it is commonly known by its Persian pronunciation Kitáb-i-Aqdas (Persian: کتاب اقدس), and is subtitled with the translation of "the Most Holy Book". The word Aqdas is a superlative form derived from the triconsonantal root Q-D-Š, denoting holiness or sanctity in Semitic languages. It is sometimes called "The Aqdas" for short.

== History ==
The Kitáb-i-Aqdas was written by Bahá’u’lláh in Acre at about the midpoint of his ministry around 1873. Bahá'ís regard it as divinely revealed, and it forms a central part of the scriptures of the Baha'i Faith. It was written as a response to inquiries from the believers about the laws of God for the new religion and guidance on how to arrange their affairs. Bahá’u’lláh later wrote that after the initial composition in the House of ‘Abbúd, he waited for some time before sending it to the believers in Iran.

The Questions and Answers portion, which is included in most publications of the Kitáb-i-Aqdas is a compilation of answers written by Bahá’u’lláh to questions put to him by various believers. It was organized by Zaynu’l-Muqarrabín, a respected transcriber of Bahá’u’lláh’s writings and one of the nineteen Apostles of Bahá’u’lláh.

At the instruction of Bahá’u’lláh, the Kitáb-i-Aqdas was first published in Bombay in 1891.

A copy of the Kitáb-i-Aqdas, dated January 1887, in the handwriting of Zaynu'l-Muqarrabín, is housed at the British Library. The library's description states, "His copies are highly regarded for their accuracy."

== Overview ==
Rather than a narrative, the book is written as a series of short teachings or principles. A summary lends itself to a bullet-point list of the various ideas shared throughout the text. Main themes cover the appointment of Baháʼu'lláh's successor, who remains unnamed in the text; the layout of the future Baháʼí administration, including the mention of the Universal House of Justice and allusions to what would later be known as the Guardian; certain laws, particularly around prayer, fasting, marriage, divorce, and inheritance; admonitions toward certain individuals; and a variety of specific laws, ordinances, and prohibitions, ranging from tithes, to the Baháʼí calendar, to prohibitions on opium, slave trading, and gossip.

Besides the main themes above, the Synopsis and Codification lists the last of six themes as "Miscellaneous Subjects" and lists 33 topics:

1. The transcendent character of the Bahá'í Revelation
2. The exalted station of the Author of the Faith
3. The supreme importance of the Kitáb-i-Aqdas, "The Most Holy Book"
4. The doctrine of the "Most Great Infallibility"
5. The twin duties of recognition of the Manifestation and observance of His Laws, and their inseparability
6. The end of all learning is the recognition of Him Who is the Object of all knowledge
7. The blessedness of those who have recognized the fundamental verity "He shall not be asked of His doings"
8. The revolutionizing effect of the "Most Great Order"
9. The selection of a single language and the adoption of a common script for all on earth to use: one of two signs of the maturity of the human race
10. Prophecies of the Báb regarding "He Whom God will make manifest"
11. Prediction relating to opposition to the Faith
12. Eulogy of the king who will profess the Faith and arise to serve it
13. The instability of human affairs
14. The meaning of true liberty
15. The merit of all deeds is dependent upon God's acceptance
16. The importance of love for God as the motive of obedience to His Laws
17. The importance of utilizing material means
18. Eulogy of the learned among the people of Bahá
19. Assurance of forgiveness to Mírzá Yahyá should he repent
20. Apostrophe addressed to Tihrán
21. Apostrophe addressed to Constantinople and its people
22. Apostrophe addressed to the "banks of the Rhine"
23. Condemnation of those who lay false claim to esoteric knowledge
24. Condemnation of those who allow pride in their learning to debar them from God
25. Prophecies relating to Khurásán
26. Prophecies relating to Kirmán
27. Allusion to Shaykh Ahmad-i-Ahsá'í
28. Allusion to the Sifter of Wheat
29. Condemnation of Hájí Muhammad-Karím Khán
30. Condemnation of Shaykh Muhammad-Hasan
31. Allusion to Napoleon III
32. Allusion to Siyyid Muhammad-i-Isfahání
33. Assurance of aid to all those who arise to serve the Faith

== Laws ==
While it is the core text on laws of the religion, it is not the exclusive source.

Baháʼu'lláh stated that the observance of the laws that he prescribed should be subject to "tact and wisdom", and that they do not cause "disturbance and dissension." He left for the progressive application of the laws to be decided by the Universal House of Justice; for example certain Baháʼí laws are currently only applicable to Iranian Baháʼís such as the limit to the period of engagement, while any Baháʼí may practice the laws if they so decide. Shoghi Effendi also stated that certain other laws, such as criminal laws, that are dependent upon the existence of a predominantly Baháʼí society would only be applicable in a possible future Baháʼí society. He also stated that if the laws were in conflict with the civil law of the country where a Baháʼí lives the laws could not be practiced. Baha'is believe the Aqdas supersedes and succeeds previous revelations such as the Quran and the Bible.

== Form and style ==
The text of the Kitáb-i-Aqdas consists of several hundred verses, which have been grouped in 190 numbered paragraphs in the English translation most of which are just a few sentences. The style combines elements of both poetry (shi'r) and rhymed prose (saj') and the text contains instances of literary devices like alliteration, assonance, repetition, onomatopoeia, juxtaposition and antithesis, metaphors, alternation of person and personification.

It is written to the individual reader, as there are no clergy in the religion. The text also moves between statements said to be plain and statements suggesting the key to understanding the book is to look at the text for clues to itself.

== Translations ==
Timeline
- 1873: Revelation
- 1961: Translation published by the Royal Asiatic Society
- 1973: Synopsis and codification
- 1992: Official Baháʼí translation in English

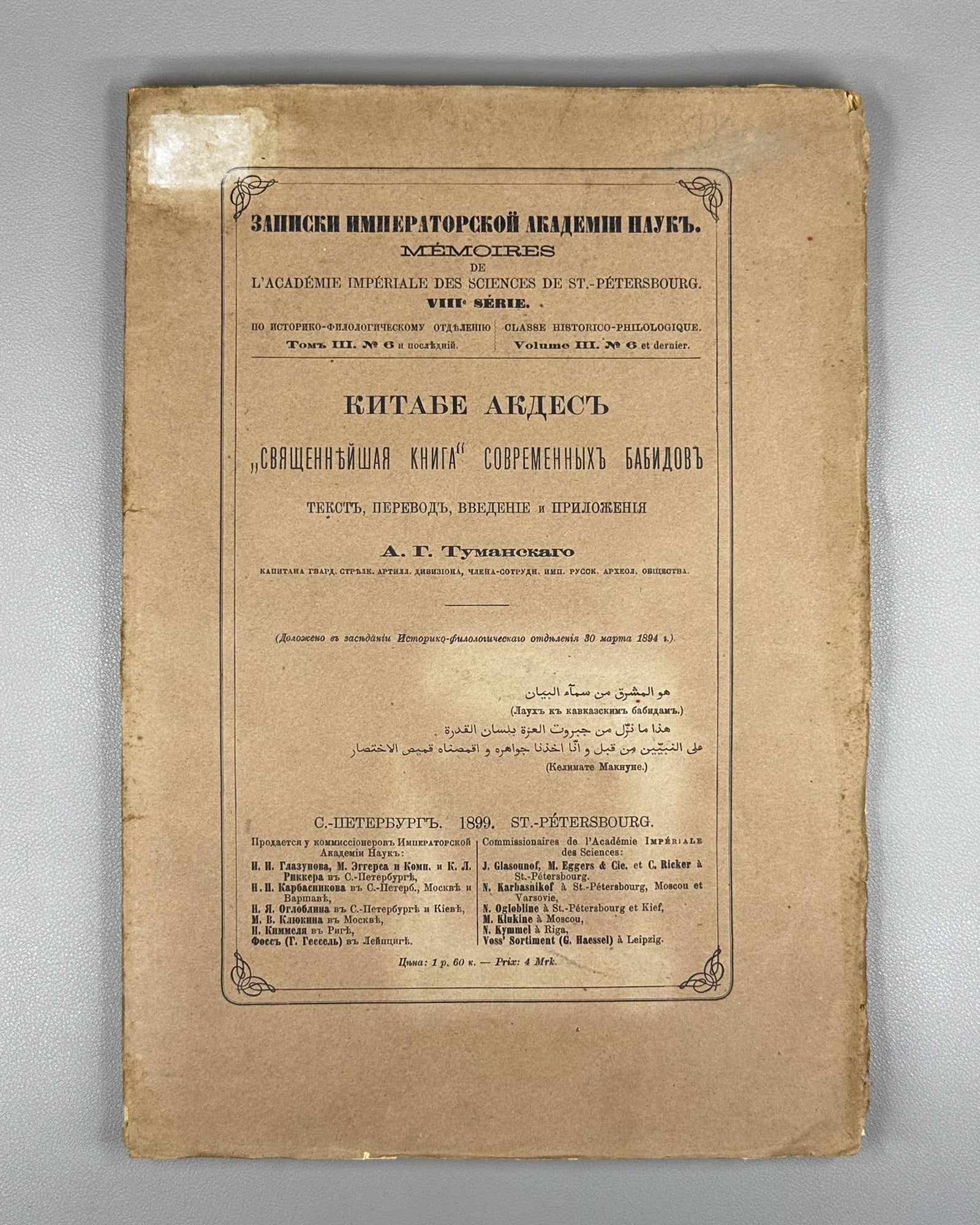
Tumansky, Aleksandr Grigorievich (1861-1920). Kitabe Akdes: "The Most Holy Book" of the Contemporary Baha'is (Babids).

The Kitáb-i-Aqdas was completed by Baháʼu'lláh in 1873. It was published in the Arabic for circulation among Baháʼís speaking the language circa 1890. A Russian translation was undertaken by Alexander Tumansky in 1899 and was his most important contribution to Baháʼí studies. Around 1900 an informal English translation was made by Baháʼí Anton Haddad, which circulated among the early American Baháʼí community in a typewritten form. In 1961, an English scholar of Arabic, Dr. Earl E. Elder, and William McElwee Miller, published an English translation, "Al-Kitab Al-Aqdas", through the Royal Asiatic Society, however its translation of the notes section was problematic and overall lacked "poetic sensibility, and skill in Arabic translation". Miller only ever used it to further his polemical agenda. In 1973 a "Synopsis and Codification" of the book was published in English by the Universal House of Justice, with 21 passages of the Aqdas that had already been translated into English by Shoghi Effendi with additional terse lists of laws and ordinances contained in the book outside of any contextual prose. Finally, in 1992, a full and authorized Baháʼí translation in English was published. This version is used as the basis of translation into many other languages highlighting the practice of an indirect translation and how the purpose of the translation affects the act of translation. The Baháʼí Library Online provides a side-by-side comparison of the authorized translation with earlier translations by Anton Haddad and Earl Elder.

== Content ==
The Kitáb-i-Aqdas is supplemented by the

- "Questions and Answers"', which consists of 107 questions submitted to Baháʼu'lláh by Zaynu'l-Muqarrabin concerning the application of the laws and Baháʼu'lláh's replies to those questions
- "Some Texts Revealed by Baháʼu'lláh"
- Synopsis and Codification of the Laws and Ordinances, prepared by Shoghi Effendi
- explanatory notes prepared by the Universal House of Justice

The book was divided into six main themes in the Synopsis and Codification by Shoghi Effendi:

1. The appointment of ʻAbdu'l-Bahá as the successor of Baháʼu'lláh
2. Anticipation of the Institution of the Guardianship
3. The Institution of the Universal House of Justice
4. Laws, Ordinances and exhortations
5. Specific admonitions, reproofs and warnings
6. Miscellaneous subjects

Further, the laws were divided into four categories:

A. Prayer
B. Fasting
C. Laws of personal status
D. Miscellaneous laws, ordinances and exhortations

=== Themes ===
A scholarly review finds the Aqdas has themes of laws of worship, societal relations and administrative organization, or governance, of the religion. Through the authority vested in ʻAbdu'l-Bahá in the Aqdas there is material on internationalism related to the law in works like The Secret of Divine Civilization and through his extended authority to Shoghi Effendi works like his World Order of Baháʼu'lláh further elaborates on the theme of internationalism. This stands in some distinction from other scriptures by not using triumphal tones as the voice of God is given to be viewed but rather one of progressive development, social context, and outright delay in application until another day. It insists that divine law is applicable only in situations with requisite conditions, where it is likely to have certain social effects. The goal of application of the law and its methods are not to cause disturbance and dissension and requires an appreciation for context and intention. Additionally one is to eschew emphasis in the development of textualist and intentionalist arguments about the law though some of this is visible in scholarship on the Aqdas. Such methods of application of law in a religious context are, in the opinion of Roshan Danish, common in Islam and Judaism.

The Aqdas is understood by Baháʼís to be a factor in the process of ongoing developments in world order. This can be seen comparing the Baháʼí approach to history and the future to that of the theory of the Clash of Civilizations on the one hand and the development of a posthegemony system on the other (compared with work of Robert Cox, for example, in Approaches to World Order, (Robert Cox & Timonthy Sinclair eds, Cambridge University Press, 1996).)

Certain possible sources of law are specifically abrogated: laws of the Bábí religion, notably in the Persian Bayán, oral traditions (linked with pilgrim notes, and natural law, (that is to say God's sovereign will through revelation is the independent authority.) Divine revelation's law-making is both unconditioned in terms of the divine right to choose, and conditioned in the sense of the progress of history from one revelation to the next.

==== Marriage and divorce ====
Baha'u'llah's statements about marriage in the Kitáb-i-Aqdas are brief. Marriage is highly recommended but is stated to not be obligatory. Baháʼu'lláh states that the maximum number of wives is two, but also states that having only one wife would add more tranquility to both partners. These statements were later interpreted by ʻAbdu'l-Bahá that having a second wife is conditional upon treating both wives with justice and equality and was not possible in practice, thus establishing monogamy.

That Baháʼu'lláh had three wives, while his religion teaches monogamy, has been the subject of criticism. The writing of the Kitáb-i-Aqdas and Baháʼí teachings on gender equality and monogamy post-date Baháʼu'lláh's marriages and are understood to be evolutionary in nature, slowly leading Baháʼís away from what had been a deeply rooted cultural practice.

==== Administration ====
The institutional status of the authority of ʻAbdu'l-Bahá and a House of Justice are specifically delineated. On the basis of the authority granted ʻAbdu'l-Bahá he extended forms of the authority vested in him to the Guardianship, whose sole member was Shoghi Effendi, and the Universal, or International, House of Justice through his Will and Testament. This was confirmed and amplified in other texts, notably the Kitáb-i-'Ahd. The Universal House of Justice is specifically empowered to write and rescind any laws it is felt necessary aside from those of the text of scripture and actual application of the laws of the Aqdas among Baháʼís are dependent on the choice of the Universal House of Justice.

== See also ==
- Kitáb-i-Íqán (The Book of Certitude)
- Tablets of Baháʼu'lláh Revealed After the Kitáb-i-Aqdas
- Kitáb-i-ʻAhd (The Will and Testament of Baháʼu'lláh)
- The Hidden Words
- Baháʼí literature
- Baháʼí prophecies

== Notes ==
- Baháʼu'lláh (1992) [1873]. Kitáb-i-Aqdas [The Most Holy Book]. Wilmette, Illinois: Baháʼí Publishing Trust. ISBN 0-85398-999-0.
- Bushrui, Suheil (1995). The Style of the Kitáb-i-Aqdas - Aspects of the Sublime (PDF). College Park, Maryland, USA: University Press of Maryland. ISBN 1-883053-08-0. OL 1114213M.
- Effendi, Shoghi (1944). God Passes By. Wilmette, Illinois, USA: Baháʼí Publishing Trust. ISBN 0-87743-020-9.
- Hatcher, J.S. (1997). The Ocean of His Words: A Reader's Guide to the Art of Baháʼu'lláh. Wilmette, Illinois, USA: Baháʼí Publishing Trust. ISBN 0-87743-259-7.
- Rouhani Ma'ani, Baharieh; Ma'ani Ewing, Sovaida. The Laws of the Kitáb-i-Aqdas. Oxford, UK: George Ronald. ISBN 978-0-85398-475-7.
- Smith, Peter (2008). An Introduction to the Baha'i Faith. Cambridge: Cambridge University Press. ISBN 978-0-521-86251-6.
- Taherzadeh, Adib (1984). The Revelation of Baháʼu'lláh, Volume 3: 'Akka, The Early Years 1868-77. Oxford, UK: George Ronald. ISBN 0-85398-144-2.
- Walbridge, John (1996). Sacred Acts, Sacred Space, Sacred Time. Oxford, UK: George Ronald. ISBN 0-85398-406-9.
