= Baháʼí Faith in the Netherlands =

The first mentions of the Baháʼí Faith in the Netherlands were in Dutch newspapers which in 1852 covered some of the events relating to the Bábí movement which the Baháʼí Faith regards as a precursor religion. Circa 1904 Algemeen Handelsblad, an Amsterdam newspaper, sent a correspondent to investigate the Baháʼís in Persia. The first Baháʼís to settle in the Netherlands were a couple of families — the Tijssens and Greevens, both of whom left Germany for the Netherlands in 1937 as business practices were affected by Nazi policies. Following World War II the Baháʼís established a committee to oversee introducing the religion across Europe and so the permanent growth of the community in the Netherlands begins with Baháʼí pioneers arriving in 1946. Following their arrival and conversions of some citizens the first Baháʼí Local Spiritual Assembly of Amsterdam was elected in 1948, with around 11 Baháʼís in the country. By 1962, at the election of its first national spiritual assembly, there were 110 Baháʼís and nine local spiritual assemblies, by 1973 there were 365 Baháʼís and 16 spiritual assemblies, and by 1979 there were 525 Baháʼís and 27 spiritual assemblies. An estimate from 1997 put Baháʼís in The Netherlands at 1500. In 2005 the Netherlands had 34 local spiritual assemblies.

== First Contact ==
=== First newspaper coverage ===
The first mentions relating to the Baháʼí Faith in the Netherlands were in Dutch newspapers which covered some of the events relating to the Bábí movement, which the Baháʼí Faith regards as a precursor religion. The Opregte Haarlemsche Courant covered the attempt on the life of Nasser-al-Din Shah, by some Bábís, on October 11, 1852 - a couple months after the incident. The incident was reported a few days later by the Nieuwe Rotterdamsche Courant and then by Dagblad van 's Gravenhage, all of which had borrowed the stories told of the event from London or Paris based newspapers. The accounts presented to the Dutch public, however, were generally untrue and described that the Babis being a communist organization, sanctioning the sharing of wives, believing in the transmigration of souls, and were in open violent revolt. During a second assassination attempt on the same Shah in 1896 by a group not associated with the Bábís, as recognized in Persia at the time, western newspapers continued to blame the Babis for some years afterwards.

=== Dutchmen in Persia ===
In 1879, on the developing trade relations initiated by some Dutch business men, Dutchman Johan Colligan entered into partnership with two Baháʼís, Haji Siyyid Muhammad-Hasan and Haji Siyyid Muhammad-Husayn, who were known as the King and Beloved of Martyrs. These two Baháʼís were arrested and executed because the Imám-Jum'ih at the time owed them a large sum of money for business relations and instead of paying them would confiscate their property. Their execution was committed despite Johan Colligan's testifying to their innocence. In 1890 Colligan was also witness to a riot against Baháʼí farmers near Isfahan which also revealed several British diplomats attempting to avert or redress the riot. Another Dutchman, C.F. Prins, witnessed and attempted to give relief to those Baháʼí who suffered in another riot in Yazd against them in 1891. In the same year, Dutchman Henri Dunlop had trade relations in Shiraz with Afnán-i-Kabir, brother to the wife of the Báb, and acquired several Baháʼí manuscripts which he offered to professor Edward Granville Browne and later to professor Michael Jan de Goeje of Leiden University who published the first Dutch academic article on the Babis/Baháʼís in October 1893. The portrait of the Babis from these accounts and articles communicated to the Dutch public was different than the early reports, and was of being prone to engage with foreigners, being monogamous, and seeking out civil authorities for protection from Muslim mobs.

Later in 1904, Maurits Wagenvoort went as a correspondent for the Algemeen Handelsblad newspaper specifically to investigate the Baháʼís in Persia and had numerous interviews with Baháʼís.

== History in the Netherlands ==
=== Before World War II ===
The first interests in the religiosity of the Baháʼí Faith in the Netherlands come in 1912-1917 when the Theosophy Publishing Society in Amsterdam translated and issued a few booklets and brochures about the religion. The first Baháʼí to enter the Netherlands came in December 1913 when Daniel Jenkyn, from England, travelled through the Netherlands. It is also known that ʻAbdu'l-Bahá, the son and successor to the founder of the religion, wrote a letter to Julia C. Isbrücker, the chairperson of the Esperanto movement in The Hague. In 1920, two Persian Baháʼís, Ahmad Yazdani and Hand of the Cause Ibn-i-Asdaq, brought a letter from ʻAbdu'l-Bahá to the Central Organisation for Durable Peace in The Hague.

The first Dutch Baháʼí appears to have been Hajo Mesdag, who became a Baháʼí in Egypt after meeting Martha Root and reading John Esslemont's book titled Baháʼu'llah and the New Era, and visited Shoghi Effendi, then head of the religion, in Haifa in 1925. A brochure of the French Baháʼí community mentions that the first Dutch Baháʼí was a Vanda Haack (or Van der Haack), about whom little is known sofar. Later in the early 1930s Louise Drake Wright, a travelling American Baháʼí, visited the country on the instructions of Shoghi Effendi on three separate occasions: the summer of 1932 (Amsterdam); March–June 1933 (Amsterdam and The Hague); January–April 1934 (The Hague). During this time she met with women's and peace groups, Quakers, Theosophists, Esperantists, and female leaders of thought such as the founder of the Netherland Girl Guides, and libraries in Amsterdam and The Hague. The earliest Baháʼí family in the Netherlands were the Tijssens: Emma Margaret Tijssen was a German Baháʼí who had come to The Hague in 1937 with her husband. They were soon joined in the autumn of 1937 by two other Baháʼís, Max and Inez Greeven. Mr. Greeven was an American businessman who had become a Baháʼí in New York City in 1927 and moved to Germany in 1930; the family's move to The Hague in 1937 was due to business restrictions in Germany; the Greevens remained in the Netherlands until 1940.

=== After World War II ===
In 1946 the Baháʼí National Spiritual Assembly of the United States formed the Baháʼí European Teaching Committee to teach the religion in Europe. This endeavour oversaw the arrival of a number of Baháʼí pioneers. In June of that year, the committee asked Rita van Bleyswijk Sombeek, a Dutch woman who had spent World War II in the United States and became a Baháʼí during that time, to return to the Netherlands to pioneer. She arrived in October 1946 and set up her home in Amsterdam. In January 1947 and by 29 May 1947 she was having meetings at her home. In January 1947, her sister Mrs. Straub also joined the religion. Straub remained in Rotterdam and concentrated on carrying out work translating Baháʼí literature. Sombeek soon undertook widespread travels across Europe living in various places. Another pioneer was John Carré who set sail from New York for the Netherlands on 12 March 1947, followed by Charlotte Stirratt on 26 March 1947. Carré stayed in nearby Bussum but soon moved to Madrid. Stirrat landed in Rotterdam and stayed to help with the work there for three weeks, then moved to Amsterdam.

Jan Piet de Borst of Wassenaar was the first to officially register in the Baháʼí Faith, converting to the religion in Bussum on 3 August 1947; another Dutchman, Hans Slim of Wassenaar, converted on 20 August 1947. The third Dutch Baháʼí was Miss Josephine Caroline Diebold, an elderly resident of Amsterdam who converted on 21 March 1948; the fourth Baháʼí was Denise Sohet from near Wassenaar; and the fifth and sixth Baháʼís were Amsterdam residents Miss Frieda van Houten and H. Bernard Dieperink, who both joined the religion on 4 April 1948. Also, by 2 September 1948, Eleanor Gregory Hollibaugh, another Baháʼí arrived in the Netherlands as a pioneer. With this mixture of pioneers and Dutch converts the first Baháʼí Local Spiritual Assembly was elected in Amsterdam in 1948. At this time there were 11 Baháʼís in the Netherlands. Edward L. Bode, an engineer, and his wife, Mary Hotchkiss Bode, arrived in Amsterdam in late March 1949 and lived in various places until in early 1969 they left for Madeira. The first Baháʼís in Rotterdam was Louis Gustave Löhlefink who joined the religion on 8 February 1953. The first Baháʼís in the West Frisian Islands of the Netherlands were two German pioneers, Geertrui Ankersmit and Ursula von Brunn, who landed on the islands in October 1953; they were followed in November 1953 by Elsa Maria Grossman. All three were named as Knights of Baháʼu'lláh for the Frisian Islands for their service to the religion.

=== Growth ===
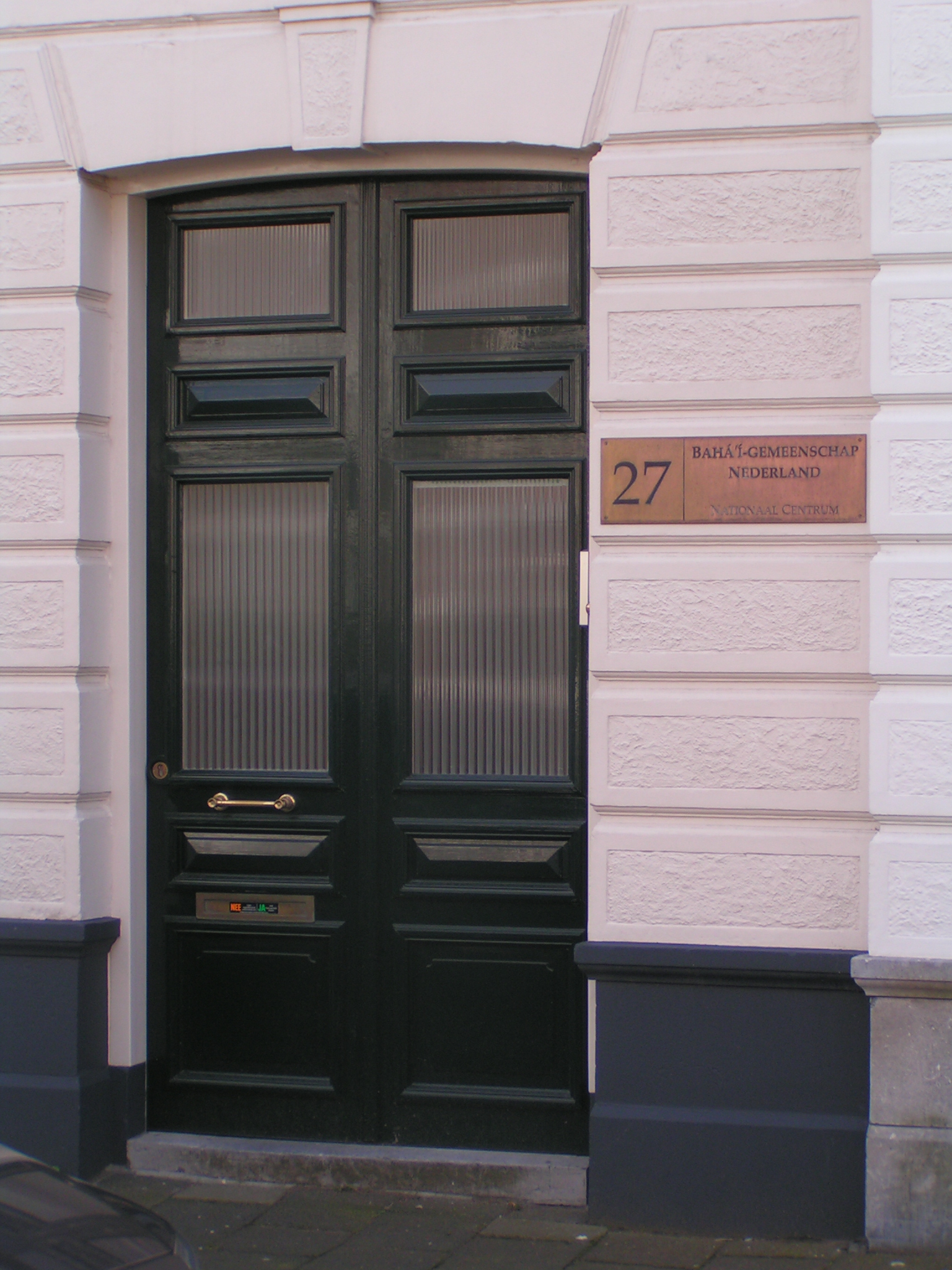
National Baháʼí Centre in The Hague

The first Baháʼí Local Spiritual Assembly of The Hague was formed in April 1952. The members of that institution included Elisabeth Charlotte (Lottie) Tobias who would later serve on the regional spiritual assembly of the Benelux countries and the first National Spiritual Assembly of the Baháʼís of the Netherlands; she served on that institution from 1962 until 1986 and was continuously elected as secretary. Also in 1952 was the second visit of a Hand of the Cause in the person of Dhikru'llah Khadem as part of a European tour. 1954 saw a conference of Baháʼís from the Benelux countries. In 1955 the national Baháʼí Centre in The Hague was purchased.

The fifth (mainland) community of Baháʼís in the country was Zandvoort, with Mr. and Mrs. Adelman who became Baháʼís in October 1956. The first Baháʼí of Leiden was Walter Italiaander, who enrolled some years after 1958. The second Leiden Baháʼí, Annemarie Niessink, later married one of the Persian Baháʼís in the country, Masu'd Mazgani.

By 1959, there were 63 Baháʼís in the Netherlands and an appeal was made by the Hands of the Cause — a group of Baháʼís who are considered to have achieved a distinguished rank in service to the religion — to the Persian Baháʼí community for the settlement of Baháʼí families in the Netherlands. Some 38 Persian Baháʼís responded, mostly families, and it was then possible to establish spiritual assemblies in Arnhem, Delft, Haarlem, Leiden, Rotterdam, and Utrecht.

From 1957 the regional spiritual assembly of the Benelux Countries (that is the Netherlands along with Belgium and Luxembourg) operated until 1962 when the population of Dutch Baháʼís reached 110 and with nine spiritual assemblies and the community first elected its own National Spiritual Assembly (with Hand of the Cause Hasan Balyuzi in attendance.) 1961 saw the first Baháʼí summer school - it was attended by 200 Baháʼís and interested people representing fifteen countries with presentations by Guy Murchie and Hand of the Cause Adelbert Mühlschlegel. In 1962 World Religion Day was celebrated consecutively in Amhem, Haarlem and Delft. When the national assembly was elected the first members were Gert van der Garde, Bob van Lith, Mas'ud Mazgani, Arnold van Ogtrop, Gieny Sijsling, Jan Sijsling, Lottie Tobias, Gunter Vieten en Chris Westenbroek. The administrative structure of the Baháʼí Faith went through a change between 1957 and 1963 when the position of head of the religion passed from Shoghi Effendi to the Universal House of Justice though it also led to a period of minor division in the religion. The Universal House of Justice wrote an extensive letter responding to requests for clarification from the National Assembly of the Netherlands in 1965. It covered questions about the election of, the station of, and authority of, the Universal House of Justice and asked that this letter be re-printed widely for Baháʼís to read around the world. Since 1962 the Benelux countries, though having each their own national assembly, had continued to pool resources for a shared summer school. In 1965 Hand of the Cause Abu'l-Qásim Faizi especially offered workshops and lectures on a variety of topics. Early 1968 saw the first coverage of the religion in the Netherlands by television. The 1969 Netherlands Summer School, held in Ellecom, had then member of the Universal House of Justice David Hofman and Hand of the Cause Jalál Khazeh.

1976 saw a variety of activities - it was the first entry to province of Zeeland and a regional conference gathered 250 Dutch Baháʼís and talks by Adib Taherzadeh. In 1977 Dr. Ahmad Taeed was one of three Baháʼí visitors to the North American Baháʼí Temple who were profiled in the August issue of Baháʼí News. He discusses his experience pioneering to the Netherlands and the growth of the community from his perspective of being an elected member of the National Spiritual Assembly of The Netherlands since 1967.

== Modern community ==
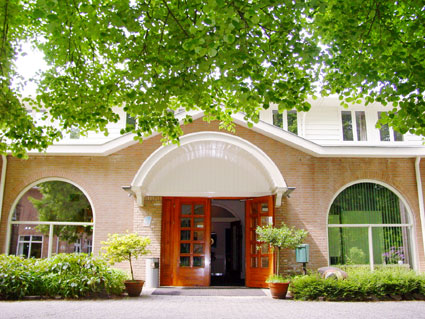
Baháʼí Conference Centre De Poort, Groesbeek

Since its inception the religion has had involvement in socio-economic development beginning by giving greater freedom to women, promulgating the promotion of female education as a priority concern, and that involvement was given practical expression by creating schools, agricultural coops, and clinics. In the Netherlands in 1979 more than 100 children from many Dutch Baháʼí communities as well as local non-Baháʼí children gathered in Lelystad for the first national Baháʼí children's conference in the Netherlands as an observance of the International Year of the Child. Also in 1979, at the invitation of the publisher, a national weekly magazine, Actuele Onderwerpen (AO) was written by a member of the national assembly to profile the religion. This issue was ranked forth out of 52 in a year-end reader interest survey conducted by the publisher. In 1980 four hundred-fifty Baháʼís including more than 120 children and youth participated in the Dutch winter school at Oostkapelle. The government of the Netherlands took a stand and spoke out about the persecution of Baháʼís in Iran in 1980 when it rose in support of the United Nations Sub-Commission on Prevention of Discrimination and Protection of Minorities. This resolution was passed September 10, 1980. The concern was repeated by the European Parliament and again the government of the Netherlands spoke specifically to the issue. The topic continued to get attention in the fall of 1983 with coverage in de Volkskrant and NRC Handelsblad, and the feminist magazine Opzij (see Mona Mahmudnizhad.)

The religion entered a new phase of activity when a message of the Universal House of Justice dated 20 October 1983 was released. Baháʼís were urged to seek out ways, compatible with the Baháʼí teachings, in which they could become involved in the social and economic development of the communities in which they lived. World-wide in 1979 there were 129 officially recognized Baháʼí socio-economic development projects. By 1987, the number of officially recognized development projects had increased to 1482. In 1985 the Dutch Baháʼí community purchased Conference Centre De Poort, Groesbeek, formerly a Jesuit Philosophicum built in 1929 to act as an institutional center for the religion.

In 1988 the national assembly of the Netherlands sought to respond to racial tensions with immigrant populations and the Dutch people in a few ways. They organized a public conference on the theme of "The Multi-Ethnic Society of the Future " and also several articles appeared in Baháʼí publications. Also in 1988 twenty-eight Baháʼís from 10 countries took an active part in the 73rd Universal Esperanto Congress at the De Doelen Center in Rotterdam. In 1989 the national center at De Poort hosted two conferences - nearly 200 people representing almost all European communities for the first European Baháʼí Women's Conference and more than 100 people from 15 countries attended a European Baháʼí Youth Conference. In 1999 the Dutch Baháʼí community helped coordinated the Baháʼí presence at the Hague Appeal for Peace.

In 2007 the Baháʼí community of the Netherlands has given a golden tile from the Shrine of the Báb to a museum that specializes in roof tiles, the Dutch Roof Tile Museum in Alem. It is the only one among the 3,000 tiles in its collection that is gilded — covered with a glaze — with real gold.

In 2005, 2006 and 2008 the Tahirih Institute of the Netherlands has held conventions with colloquia and Dr. Aziz Navidi Memorial Lectures named after a prominent Baháʼí lawyer, and Knight of Baháʼu'lláh for Monaco, renowned for his courage and skill in defending persecuted Baháʼís.

=== Demographics ===
In 1973 there were 365 Baháʼís and 16 spiritual assemblies; in 1979, there were 525 Baháʼís with 27 spiritual assemblies. In 1997 there were about 1500 Baháʼís in The Netherlands. The Association of Religion Data Archives (relying on World Christian Encyclopedia) estimated some 6688 Baháʼís in 2005. Also in 2005 the Netherlands had 34 local spiritual assemblies.

== Dutch colonies ==
The first Baháʼí on Suriname was American Leonora Stirling Holsapple; in October 1927 she gave a lecture about the religion in the Loge Concordia centre in the capital Paramaribo. On 22 October 1927 an article appeared in the evening newspaper De West covering the event. Between 1964 and 1973 Dutch overseas pioneers established a Baháʼí Spiritual Assembly in Suriname at Paramaribo. Piet van der Borst and Hendrik Buys left the Netherlands to pioneer in Indonesia in 1949.

== See also ==
- Religion in the Netherlands
- History of the Netherlands
- Baháʼí Faith by country
- Tablet to The Hague

== Notes ==
- van den Hoonaard, Will (1993-11-08). "Netherlands: History of the Baha'i Faith". The Bahá'í Encyclopedia: draft. Baha'i Library Online.
- de Vries, Jelle (2002). The Babi Question You Mentioned--: The Origins of the Baha'i Community of the Netherlands, 1844-1962. Peeters Publishers. ISBN 978-90-429-1109-3.
- Hoekstra, E.G.; Ypenburg, M.H. (2000). Wegwijs in religieus en levensbeschouwelijk Nederland. Kampen: Uitgeverij Kok. ISBN 90-435-0028-3.
