= Ibn-i-Asdaq =

Prominent Iranian Bahá'í

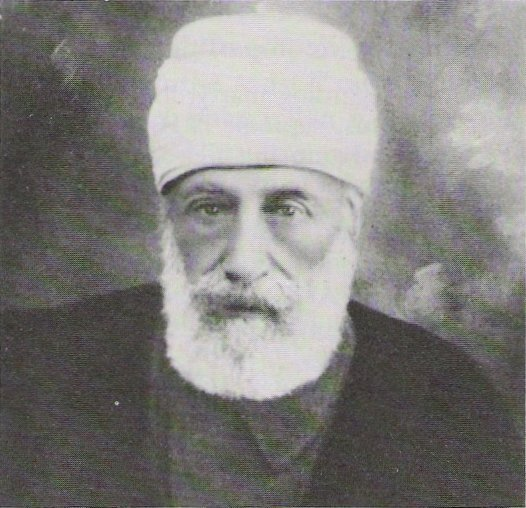
Ibn-i-Asdaq at an older age.

Mírzá ʻAlí-Muḥammad-i-K͟hurásání (Arabic: ميرزا علي محمد خراساني; b. 1850, d. 1928), known as Ibn-i-Aṣdaq, was an eminent follower of Baháʼu'lláh, the founder of the Baháʼí Faith. He was appointed a Hand of the Cause and identified as one of the nineteen Apostles of Baháʼu'lláh.

Ibn-i-Asdaq was addressed by Baháʼu'lláh as Shahíd Ibn-i-Shahíd (Martyr, son of the Martyr). He was the son of a distinguished martyr of the Bábí movement, and himself requested several times to give his life up for the Baháʼí Cause. The response by Baháʼu'lláh was, "Today, the greatest of all deeds is service to the Cause... This martyrdom is not confined to the destruction of life and the shedding of blood. A person enjoying the bounty of life may yet be recorded a martyr..." (Eminent Baháʼís, p. 172).

In 1920, Ibn-i-Asdaq and Ahmad Yazdani, brought the Tablet to The Hague from ʻAbdu'l-Bahá to the Central Organisation for Durable Peace in The Hague.

Ironically, Ibn-i-Asdaq lived a long life of service, dying in 1928. He was one of the few Apostles to live into the time of Shoghi Effendi as the Guardian.

== History ==
Ibn-i-Asdaq at a younger age.

As his name implies, Ibn-i-Asdaq was the son of Ismu'lláhu'l-Asdaq of Khurásán, also known as Mullá Sádiq-i-Muqaddas. Mullá Sádiq together with Quddús and Mullá Alí Akbar-i-Ardistání were the first three Bábís known to suffer persecution for their faith on Persian soil. He was also a survivor of the Fort Tabarsi engagement in Mazandaran province (1848). Ibn-i-Asdaq's daughter, Ruha Asdaq, later wrote a book about her pilgrimage experiences called One Life One Memory.

Baha'u'llah counted Ibn-i-Asdaq a living martyr towards the end of his life and referred to him as "martyr, son of a martyr". Around 1861–2, Ibn-i-Asdaq and his father were imprisoned for over two years in the dungeon of Tehran. It was in that dungeon that a Jewish physician by the name of Hakim Masih attended him. The physician later on converted to the Baha'i Faith and is considered the first Jewish convert to the new Faith. To teach the Baha'i Faith, Ibn-i-Asdaq visited many parts of Persia, Iraq, India, Burma, and Caucasia, as well as Ashkhabad and Marv. He was also a permanent member of the first Central Spiritual Assembly established at Abdul-Baha's direction in Tehran in 1897. Ibn-i-Asdaq visited Abdul-Baha and Baha'u'llah several times in Palestine. Abdul-Baha entrusted Ibn-i-Asdaq with various tasks such as the presentation of his "Treatise on Politics" to Naser al-Din Shah, to contemporary religious authorities, and to Persian notables. In 19191, Ibn-i-Asdaq and Ahmad Yazdani were asked by Abdul-Baha to deliver his Tablet addressed to the Central Organization for a Durable Peace, The Hague. Baha'u'llah designated Ibn-i-Asdaq as a Hands of the Cause of God, and Shoghi Effendi, the guardian of the Baha'i Faith, designated Ibn-i-Asdaq as one of the nineteen apostles of Baha'u'llah.
