= Hooshmand Dehghan =

Iranian scholar, translator (born 1969)

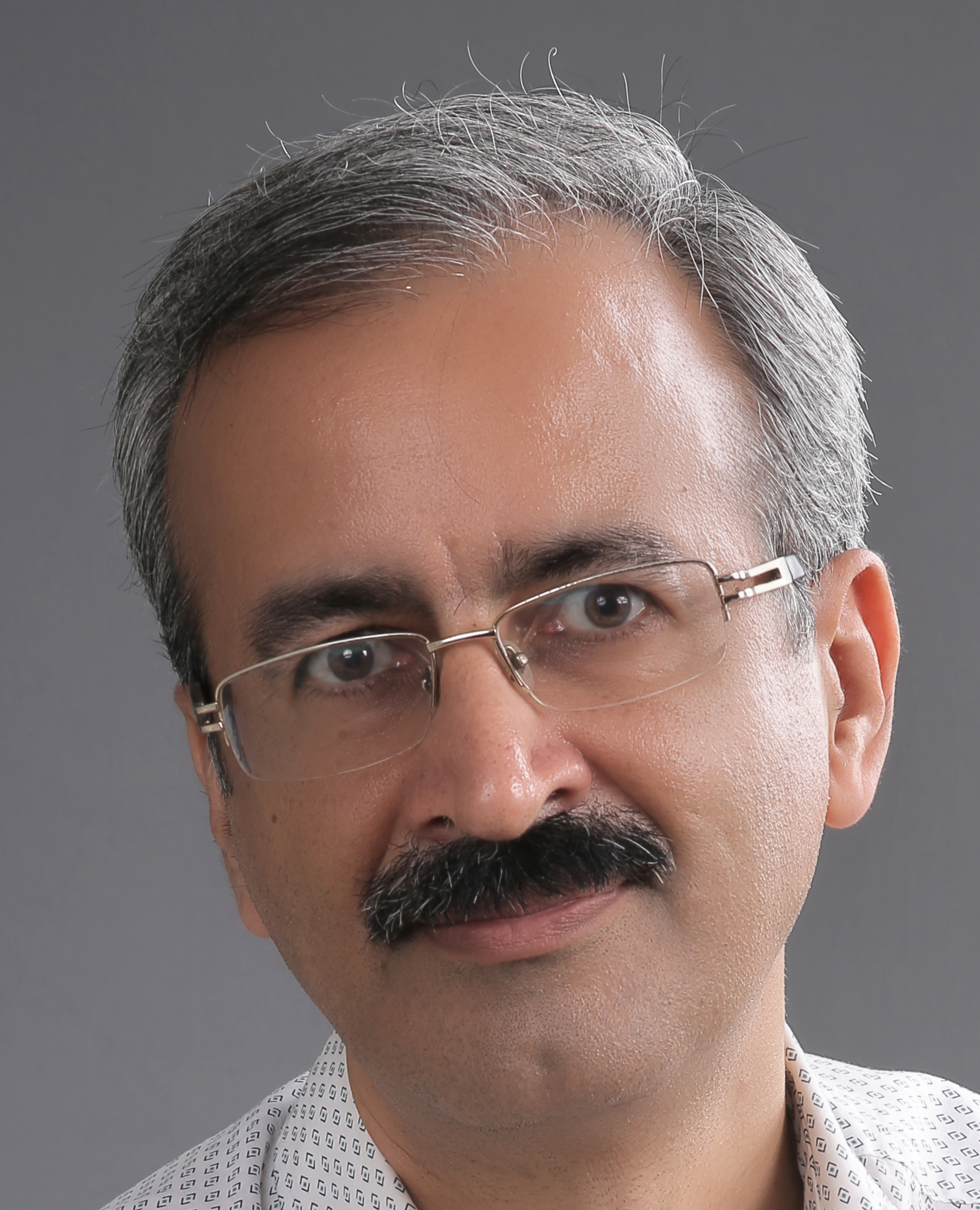
- Born: 1969 (age 56–57); Kashan, Iran
- Known for: Bábí studies and Islamic mysticism

Academic work
- Discipline: Scholar and translator
- Notable works: Ganj-i-Penhan (The Hidden Treasure: The Life and Works of Quddús)

Hooshmand Dehghan (born 1969) is an Iranian scholar and translator. His research focuses on Bábí studies and Islamic mysticism. He authored Ganj-i-Penhan (2016), a study of the life and works of Quddús. In this monograph, he performed codicological research to correct manuscript errors documented by Edward Granville Browne. The book has been cited by scholars Boris Handal and Stephen Lambden. Beyond Bábí studies, he has researched the influence of Konya on Rumi's poetry and translated thirteen books into Persian, including works by Rumi scholar William Chittick. However, some of his translations, including Andrew Mango’s Atatürk, have been subject to criticism by reviewers. Alongside his research and translation work, Dehghan was arrested in 2012 for his religious beliefs. He was later released after serving a portion of his sentence.

== Early life and education ==
Dehghan was born in 1969 in Kashan, Isfahan Province. He later moved to Gorgan, Golestan Province, in northeastern Iran, where he resides currently. He became interested in Quddús during his childhood. This followed his reading of a book on early Bábí history by Fariborz Sahba, the architect of the Lotus Temple. His formal schooling concluded at the high school diploma level, and he did not enter a public university. He later pursued studies at the Ma'aref-e-Aali Institute (an internal religious educational body later integrated into the BIHE). In the institute, his thesis focused on the life of Quddús. This research later expanded into his main work, Ganj-i-Penhan. Later in his career, he developed skills in translation through self-study. He has so far translated thirteen books into Persian. His first translation was of the book The Ishraqi Philosophy of Jalal al-Din Rumi by Iraj Bashiri. His background in Islamic mysticism made the translation easier for him, but the manuscript was never published. After completing the translation of the book, he realized that the author had simultaneously prepared a Persian version of the work alongside the English original. Despite this, he immediately turned to translating William Chittick's book, Ibn 'Arabi: Heir to the Prophets.

== Career ==
Dehghan's research focuses primarily on Bábí studies and Islamic mysticism (Sufism).

=== Bábí studies: Ganj-i-Penhan ===
Cover of the first edition of Ganj-i-Penhan (2016)

His book, Ganj-i-Penhan (The Hidden Treasure: The Life and Works of Quddús), is about Bábí studies and is held in the collections of major reference libraries, including the Library of Congress, and the universities of Harvard, Stanford, and Columbia. This book is the first independent study about Quddús (Mullá Muḥammad ʻAlí-i-Bárfurúshi), a prominent disciple of the Báb. (Note: In his introduction, Dehghan (2016, p. 21) analyzes existing literature on Bábí history—including Fádil Māzandarānī's Ẓuhūr al-Ḥaqq (1942), Hooshang Goharriz's Ḥurūf-i Ḥayy (1993), Nosrat Muhammad-Husayni's Ḥaḍrat-i Báb (1995), and Abbas Amanat's Resurrection and Renewal (1989)—noting that while these works cover Quddús's life, they do so as part of broader studies. He states that prior to Ganj-i-Penhan, no book-length independent biography dedicated solely to Quddús had been published.) Beyond archival research, Dehghan conducted fieldwork, traveling to various Iranian cities including Kerman, Babol and Qaem Shahr, to interview descendants and elderly witnesses of the Bábí period. During these travels, he documented some historical findings: In Qaem Shahr, Mazandaran Province, Northern Iran, Dehghan realized that certain elderly Baháʼí Faith residents of the area still remembered how Quddús's stepmother used to visit the graveyard there. In the Jameh Mosque of Kerman, he identified the famous "Sang-e-Ayeneh" (which means "Mirror Stone"), a site where Quddús was known to stand and recite the writings of the Báb aloud. In Babol, the birthplace of Quddús in Northern Iran, he met an elderly family who had firsthand contact with the sister-in-law of Quddús.

In addition to the life of Quddús, Ganj-i-Penhan (2016) provides a critical edition of his works based on the collation of seven manuscripts. This research is recognized in specialized bibliographies of Quddús's writings, such as those maintained by Stephen Lambden.

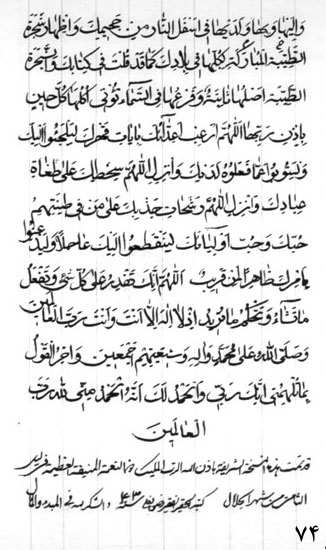
A manuscript of Āthár al-Quddúsiyya handwritten by Riḍvān ʿAlī, as referenced on page 167 of Ganj-i-Penhan.

In a detailed codicological study, later expanded in an English paper (2025), Dehghan identifies a collection titled Āthár al-Quddúsiyya (آثار القدوسیه) as being in the handwriting of Riḍván ʿAlí (the son of Ṣubḥ-i-Azal). He notes that these manuscripts were originally acquired from Riḍván ʿAlí by the British Commissioner in Cyprus and later delivered to the British Museum. While Edward Granville Browne had recorded this collection as Abḥár al-Quddúsiyya (ابحار القدوسیه) based on notes by Ahmad Khan Qazvini (a Persian teacher at the University of Cambridge and brother of the scholar Muhammad Qazvini), Dehghan proposes a re-reading of the title, suggesting it as a transliteration error. He argues that Ahmad Khan mistakenly recorded Āthár (آثار) as Abḥár (ابحار) in his notes provided to Browne in 1915. As noted by Dehghan, Browne’s own work mentions the correct title, Āthár (آثار), in the manuscript’s opening lines. While scholars such as Denis MacEoin and Browne had previously indexed these manuscripts (referencing the same collection in the Cambridge University Library and the Journal of the Royal Asiatic Society), Dehghan's study provides a textual collation to correct this historical title and resolve the discrepancies in the bibliographic sources.

Dehghan's work focuses on re-examining established narratives in Bábí studies, where he proposes revisions to several historical accounts: He challenges the authenticity of a letter sent to Quddús by Mahdī Qulī Mīrzā, a cousin of Nāṣer al-Dīn Shāh; Based on his research of contemporary newspapers, he identifies a specific date for the renaming of Bárfurúsh to Babol; (Note: By reviewing the 1931 issues of the newspaper Ettela'at, Dehghan found that reports regarding the city were filed under the name Bárfurúsh until 27 December (6 Dey 1310 SH), but from 29 December (8 Dey 1310 SH) onwards, the reports were recorded using the name Babol.) While Abbas Amanat estimates Quddus's birth year as c. 1819-1820, Dehghan proposes 1822 based on his analysis of historical evidence; (Note: Dehghan proposes 1822 as the birth year based on his analysis of historical evidence. He refers to Nabil-i-Zarandi (1970, p. 72) and Shoghi Effendi (1944, chap. 1), who both state that Quddús was twenty-two years old when he arrived in Shiraz and embraced the Báb's declaration in 1844.) In Babol, Dehghan physically retraced the final path of Quddús from the site of his trial to the place of his execution. By walking the route himself, he estimated the distance at 800 paces, documenting the historical account of Quddús's final journey and execution. Dehghan's work on Bábí history includes a rejection of the portrait traditionally attributed to Quddús. (Note: Dehghan bases his rejection of the portrait on the timeline of photography in Iran, noting that the daguerreotype was introduced to Iran by Jules Richard between 1844 and 1849, coinciding with the period of Quddús's life and martyrdom. Furthermore, Dehghan cites a communication with Ja’far Niaki, the author of Babol, Shahr-i Zībā-yi Man (where the photo was first published), who acknowledged that he could not provide evidence for attributing the image to Quddús. (See: Handal 2024, p. 500)) That photo was first published in the book, Babol, Shahr-i Zībā-yi Man (Babol, My Beautiful City).

=== Islamic mysticism ===
Drawing on Shamsuddin Aflaki's biographies and the research of Michael Pifer, Dehghan argues that the multicultural and music-oriented atmosphere of 13th-century Konya acted as a catalyst. Indeed, it was such an atmosphere that transformed Rumi from a traditional jurist into a mystical poet. According to Dehghan’s analysis, Rumi’s adaptation to Konya was a conscious response to the "joy-oriented" temperament of the local people. This response was in stark contrast to his early life in Balkh, where he had initially considered composing poetry a "shameful" occupation. This transformation was further intensified when Rumi met Shams Tabrizi, who had defined music and Sama as "pure verbal revelation" and essential tools for spiritual transcendence. Ultimately, Dehghan argues that Rumi’s fusion of poetry and mysticism was a direct product of this geographical shift. He thinks if Rumi had not left Khorasan, probably he would have stuck to being a regular jurist and not picked up a new style of aesthetics.

Dehghan has also studied the Muslim mystic Ibn Arabi. He wrote extensive commentary and explanations on Ibn Arabi's mystical school in a translation of one of William Chittick's books. Specifically, he engages in the genealogy of mystical terms such as Wahdat al-wujūd (Unity of Existence). In his extensive commentaries, drawing on the research of Claude Addas and Miguel Asín Palacios, Dehghan further demonstrates that Dante Alighieri's Divine Comedy was significantly influenced by Ibn Arabi's Kitāb al-Isrā (The Book of the Night Journey).

== Critical reception ==
=== Academic praise ===
Stephen Lambden, a scholar at the University of California, Merced includes Dehghan in a list of notable Baháʼí historians. He writes, "Among Bahā’ī writers who wrote about the Bāb and his writings one should consult the often prolific literary output of (to be selective) Mirza Abū al-Faḍl Gulpayiganī […] Hasan Balyuzi; Alessandro Bausani; Denis MacEoin; Abbas Amanat; Moojan Momen [...] Juan Cole […] Hooshmand Dehqan […]." Lambden writes about Dehghan's book, Ganj-i-Penhan: sargozasht va asar-i hazrat-i Quddus, "An important volume about the life and writings of Muhammad `Ali Barfurushi entitled Quddus." He adds "it includes important Tablets [Sacred Writings], Ziyarat-Namah [Visitation Tablet] and other materials addressed by the Báb to this important 18th Huruf al-Hayy [the first eighteen disciples of the Báb]."

Boris Handal, a professor of Educational Technologies at the University of Notre Dame Australia and researcher in Bábí and Baháʼí studies, cites Dehghan 123 times in his own book, Quddús: First in Rank. He names Dehghan as a historical advisor and evaluates several aspects of his findings. His analysis shows that Dehghan has managed to add details to the biography of Quddús, including those about Quddús’ family structure, his intellectual background, and the route of his travels. Furthermore, he devotes several pages of the book to discussing Dehghan's historical views about Quddús.

=== Translation reviews ===
Dehghan's translation and commentary have been analyzed in academic journals. Fatemeh Aghaya, a scholar of Shiite Sects, compared Dehghan's Persian rendering of Chittick's Ibn 'Arabi: Heir to the Prophets with other existing translations, stating that Dehghan's work provides more extensive research on Ibn Arabi's specific terminology. Aghaya further notes that the work extends beyond translation, as Dehghan identifies the hadith-based and mystical origins of Ibn Arabi's terminology. She specifically points to the footnotes as providing additional research that accompanies the Persian text. Additionally, she describes Dehghan's translation as more fluent when compared to other available Persian versions of Chittick's work.

Regarding his historical translations, in March 2016, the monthly journal Mehrnameh dedicated a 13-page dossier titled Jomhuri-ye Aameraneh (The Authoritarian Republic) to Atatürk, on the occasion of the publication of Dehghan's translation of Andrew Mango's biography. The dossier included various analyses of the work and its Persian rendering. In this dossier, the historian and member of the Encyclopaedia Islamica Foundation, Rahim Raisnia, described the translation as "generally acceptable" but pointed out several inaccuracies, particularly in the recording of Turkish names and terminology. Raisnia argued that Dehghan's lack of familiarity with the Turkish language led to certain errors; for instance, he noted that Dehghan recorded the surname of Atatürk's wife (Uşakîzâde) starting with the Persian letter Alef (as Oshāghīzādeh / اوشاقی‌زاده) instead of the etymologically correct Eyn (as ʿOshshāghīzādeh / عشاقی‌زاده).

== Arrest and imprisonment ==
Dehghan was arrested in Gorgan in the fall of 2012 during a wave of arrests of Baháʼís in Golestan Province. Due to his Baháʼí Faith, he was initially sentenced to six years in prison. Charges included "membership in an illegal Baha’i organization with the intent to undermine national security" and "propaganda against the regime". This initial sentence was later reduced to one year in prison by the Court of Appeal in January 2016. He was subsequently re-arrested in June 2017 and transferred to Gorgan's Amirabad Prison to serve his sentence. In August 2017, after suffering brain strokes, Dehghan was approved by a physician and subsequently transported to the hospital in handcuffs and foot restraints. He was conditionally released from prison after having completed one-third of his sentence.

== Bibliography ==
=== Authored books ===
- Dehghan, Hooshmand (2016). Ganj-i-Penhan: Sarguzasht va Asar-i Hazrat-i Quddus (The Hidden Treasure: The Life and Works of Quddus). Luxembourg: Intishārāt-i ʻĀdil. ISBN 978-3-01-003131-8.

=== Translations ===
Dehghan translated thirteen volumes into Persian between 2014 and 2020, focusing on subjects such as Islamic mysticism, philosophy, history, and sociology. According to the records of the National Library and Archives of Iran, no further translations have been published by him in the country since 2020. His Persian translation of Martin Suter's Small World was reviewed by critic Faraj Sarkohi on Radio Farda. Dehghan has stated that his translation work aims to convey the intellectual context of the original authors, particularly in the study of classical mystical philosophy.

Title	Author	Year	Publisher	Ref
Ibn ʿArabī: Heir to the Prophets	William Chittick	2014	Payam-e Emrooz	
Atatürk: The Biography of the Founder of Modern Turkey	Andrew Mango	2015	Payam-e Emrooz	
Socrates: A Man for Our Times	Paul Johnson	2016	Payam-e Emrooz	
At the Existentialist Café	Sarah Bakewell	2016	Payam-e Emrooz	
Happiness: A Philosopher's Guide	Frédéric Lenoir	2017	Payam-e Emrooz	
Irresistible	Adam Alter	2017	Payam-e Emrooz	
Educated	Tara Westover	2018	Niloofar	
Atomic Habits	James Clear	2018	Hormazd	
Drunk Tank Pink	Adam Alter	2019	Tarjomaan	
An Unwanted Guest	Shari Lapena	2019	Nashr-e Sales	
Neither Victims nor Executioners	Albert Camus	2019	Razgoo	
Pandemic! COVID-19 Shakes the World	Slavoj Žižek	2020	Seday-e Mo’aser	
A Small World	Martin Suter	2020	Niloofar	

== See also ==
- Quddús
- Babism

== Sources ==
- Aghaya, Fatemeh (2023). "Dehghan's Translation of Chittick's Book on Ibn Arabi and Its Terminology". Interdisciplinary Studies on the Quran and Hadith. 4 (1): 81–99.
- Amanat, Abbas (1989). Resurrection and Renewal: The Making of the Babi Movement in Iran, 1844-1850. Cornell University Press. ISBN 978-0-8014-2098-6.
- Bashiri, Iraj (2025). "The Ishraqi Philosophy of Jalal al-Din Rumi". anyflip.
- Browne, Edward G. (1892). "Catalogue of the Bábí Manuscripts in the British Museum". Journal of the Royal Asiatic Society: 483–487.
- Browne, Edward G. (1918). Materials for the Study of the Babi Religion. Cambridge University Press.
- Chittick, William (2014). Ibn Arabi: Varis-e Anbiya [Ibn 'Arabi: Heir to the Prophets] (in Persian). Translated by Hooshmand Dehghan. Tehran: Payam-e Emrooz.
- Dehghan, Hooshmand (2016). Ganj-i-Penhan: Sarguzasht va Asar-i Hazrat-i Quddus (in Persian). [Luxembourg]: Intishārāt-i ʻĀdil. ISBN 978-3-01-003131-8.
- Dehghan, Hooshmand (2025a). "Rūmī and the Challenge of Joyous Spirituality". Academia.edu.
- Dehghan, Hooshmand (2025b). "Codicology and Manuscript Study of Quddús's Works (Ganj-i-Penhan)". Academia.edu.
- Effendi, Shoghi (1944). God Passes By. Wilmette, Illinois, USA: Bahá’í Publishing Trust.
- Handal, Boris (2024). Quddús: The First in Rank. Bella Vista, New South Wales: Boris Handal. ISBN 0-64589-632-2. OCLC 1479336163.
- Lewis, Franklin D. (2000). Rumi: Past and Present, East and West. Oneworld. ISBN 978-1-85168-214-0.
- MacEoin, Denis (1992). The Sources for Early Bábí Doctrine and History (PDF). Leiden, The Netherlands: Brill. ISBN 90-04-09462-8.
- Nabil-i-Zarandi, Muhammad (1970). The Dawn-Breakers: Nabíl’s Narrative of the Early Days of the Bahá’í Revelation. Translated by Effendi, Shoghi. Wilmette, Illinois: Bahá’í Publishing Trust. ISBN 978-0877430100.
- Nīākī, Ja'far (2004). Babol, Shahr-i Zībā-yi Man [Babol, My Beautiful City] (in Persian). Vol. 1. Tehran: Sālmī Publications.
- Pifer, Michael (2021). Kindred Voices: A Literary History of Medieval Anatolia (eBook). New Haven: Yale University Press. ISBN 0-300-25865-8. OCLC 1255235360.
- Rumi, Jalāl al-Dīn (1981). Forūzānfar, B. (ed.). Fīhi Mā Fīh (in Persian). Tehran: Amir Kabir.
- Schimmel, Annemarie (1996) [1992]. I Am Wind, You Are Fire: The Life and Work of Rumi. Shambhala. ISBN 1-57062-246-9. OCLC 36257179.
