= The Turks Today =

Book by Andrew Mango

- Author: Andrew Mango
- ISBN: 978-0719565953

The Turks Today is a book by Andrew Mango about Turkey's development since the death of the founder of Turkey, Mustafa Kemal Atatürk in 1938 until today. It is the sequel to his biography of Atatürk, Attaturk: The Biography of the Founder of Modern Turks.

== See also ==
- History of Turkey
