= Tablet to The Hague =

1919 letter of ʻAbdu'l-Bahá to the Central Organisation for Durable Peace in The Hague

The Tablet to The Hague is a letter which ʻAbdu'l-Bahá wrote to the Central Organisation for Durable Peace in The Hague, The Netherlands on 17 December 1919.

== Historical background ==
When the Central Organization for Durable Peace came together, it published its constitution in newspapers all over the world. This was read by Mr. Ahmad Yazdání who in consultation with Hand of the Cause Mr. Ibn-i-Asdaq wrote a paper to the organization informing them about the Baháʼí Principles and suggesting they seek guidance from ʻAbdu'l-Bahá regarding their aim to establish universal peace. The organization wrote a letter through Mr. Yazdání to ʻAbdu'l-Bahá dated February 11, 1916. When the letter arrived ʻAbdu'l-Bahá revealed the "Tablet to The Hague" which was delivered in person to the organization by Mr. Yazdání and Mr. Ibn-i-Asdaq in June 1920. The letter was dated February 11, 1916, but this letter did not arrive for many years due to the war. By the time the letter arrived the organization had already been disbanded in June 1919 after the signing of the treaty of Versailles.

== Content of the Tablet ==
In the tablet, ʻAbdu'l-Bahá gives an overview of Baháʼí principles, which include the following:

- Declaration of universal peace.
- Independent investigation of reality.
- Oneness of humanity.
- Religion must be the cause of fellowship and love.
- Religion must be in conformity with science and reason.
- Abandonment of religious, racial, political, economic and patriotic prejudices.
- One universal language.
- Equality of women and men.
- Voluntary sharing one's property.
- Man's freedom from the captivity of the world of nature.
- Religion is the ideal safeguard.
- Material civilization should be combined with Divine civilization.
- Promotion of education.
- Justice and right.

He declares that the League of Nations is "incapable of establishing universal peace", and calls for the establishment of a Supreme Tribunal, representing all countries:

When the Supreme Tribunal gives a ruling on any international question, either unanimously or by majority rule, there will no longer be any pretext for the plaintiff or ground of objection for the defendant. In case any of the governments or nations, in the execution of the irrefutable decision of the Supreme Tribunal, be negligent or dilatory, the rest of the nations will rise up against it, because all the governments and nations of the world are the supporters of this Supreme Tribunal.

== Second Tablet to the Hague ==
The organization wrote a response to the "Tablet to the Hague" on the 12th of June 1920. ʻAbdu'l-Bahá responded with a second, shorter tablet to the Hague on the July 12, 1920.

== See also ==
- Baháʼí Faith in the Netherlands
- Hague Conventions of 1899 and 1907
