= Conference of Badasht =

Meeting of leading Bábís in Iran in 1848

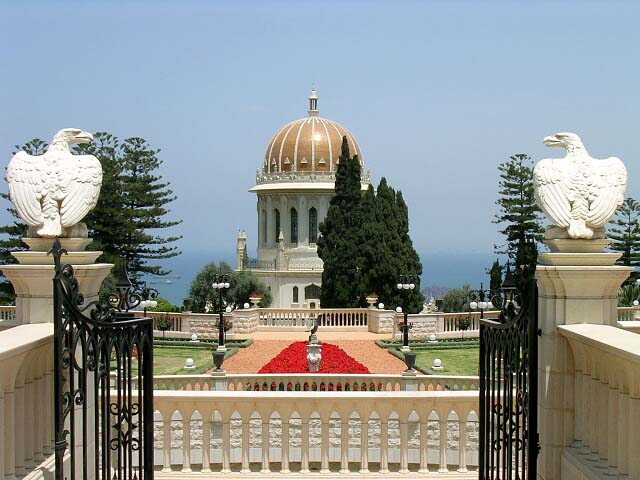
Shrine of the Báb

The Conference of Badasht (Persian: گردهمایی بدشت) was an instrumental meeting of the leading Bábís in Iran during June–July 1848.

In June–July 1848 over a period of 3 weeks, a number of Bábí leaders met in the village of Badasht at a conference, organized in part and financed by Baháʼu'lláh, centered on Táhirih and Quddús, that set in motion the public existence and promulgation of the Bábí religion. Around eighty men and Táhirih attended the conference. The conference is considered by Bábís and Baháʼís as a signal moment that demonstrated that Islamic Sharia law had been abrogated and superseded by Bábí law, as well as a key demonstration of the thrust of raising the social position of women.

== Leading figures and events ==
After the Báb's arrest in early 1848, Mulla Muhammad Ali Barfurushi, aka Quddús, had sought to raise the Black Standard in Mashad. However the city forced the Bábís out, (it was later officially raised by Mullá Husayn-i-Bushru'i.) At the same time Táhirih had expressed an interest in making a pilgrimage to the fortress of Máh-Kú in the province of Azarbaijan where the Báb, founder of the Bábí faith, was being held. That proved untenable. Instead, Baháʼu'lláh made arrangements for Táhirih to leave Tehran to join forces with Quddús. Along the way they encountered Quddús and together they settled on Badasht for the location for a meeting.

The three key individuals each had a garden:

- Táhirih
- Quddús
- Baháʼu'lláh

In one account the purpose of the conference was to initiate a complete break in the Babi community with the Islamic past. The same account notes that a secondary reason was to find a way to free the Bab from the prison of Chiriq, and it was Tahirih who pushed the notion that there should be an armed rebellion to save the Bab and create the break. Another source states that there was no doubt that prominent Babi leaders wanted to plan an armed revolt. It seems that much of what Tahirih was pushing was beyond what most of the other Babis were about to accept.

The first topic of the conference was seeking the freedom of the Báb from arrest. Following this the question of exactly what the Báb's precise claim was, was raised.

Bábís were divided somewhat between those that viewed the movement as a break with Islam, centered on Táhirih, and those with a more cautious approach, centered on Quddús. Scholars and chroniclers of the time characterize the conference as determined by the differences and resolution between Quddús and Táhirih. Many sources note the role of Baháʼu'lláh in resolving the issues, and resolving them in favor of Táhirih. It was in fact at the conference that the name Táhirih – "The Pure" was introduced by Baháʼu'lláh, as well as other names for individuals. According to Nabíl-i-Aʻzam all three were named thusly by Baháʼu'lláh at the conference. Indeed, all attendees may have been given new names.

The major events included, as an act of symbolism, Táhirih taking off her traditional veil in front of an assemblage of men on one occasion and brandished a sword on another. The unveiling caused shock and consternation amongst the men present as it was a very visible challenge to the cultural/religious ways of seeing an esteemed woman. Prior to this, many had regarded Táhirih as the epitome of purity and the spiritual return of Fatima al-Zahra, the daughter of Muhammad. Many screamed in horror at the sight, and one man was so horrified that he cut his own throat and, with blood pouring from his neck, fled the scene. Táhirih then arose and began a speech on the break from Islam. She quoted from the Quran, "verily, amid gardens and rivers shall the pious dwell in the seat of truth, in the presence of the potent King" as well as proclaiming herself the Word the Qa'im would utter on the day of judgement. The unveiling caused shock and consternation amongst the men present. The events decisively changed the orientation of the Bábís in their religious endeavors.

The circumstances of the conference in a Persian Paradise garden along with Táhirih's address to the audience underscored the difference between Islamic theology and practice: that Islamic paradise, the perfect condition requiring human participation and not just reflection, differed from the rules of Sharia and thus the rules were derived from human interpretation of the divine claiming an authority it did not have – that a place of public discourse like a garden was forbidden to unveiled women, whereas paradise in action in fact required it. This became the key way of differentiating the dispensation of Islam from the events in the garden

According to Moojan Momen, the accusation of immorality among the Babis is confirmed by some Bábí and Baháʼí sources. Mongol Bayat refers to the accusations of immorality at the conference as "grossly exaggerated", though she echoes that there was "mischief which a few of the irresponsible among the adherents of the Faith had sought". According to Peter Smith, some followers of the new faith "openly broke with Islamic practice, either to 'gratify their selfish desires', or as a deliberate act to proclaim the new day."

After Táhirih and Quddús reconciled their differences the two departed from Badasht riding in the same howdah. When they neared the village of Níyálá, the local mullá, outraged at seeing an unveiled woman sitting next a group of men and chanting poems aloud, led a mob against them. Several people died in the resulting clash and the Bábís were forced to disperse in different directions. Quddús eventually traveled to where Mullá Husayn was, at Shrine of Tabarsi where important events unfolded. Táhirih was arrested and held in Tehran.

== Importance ==
The conference of Badasht is considered by Bábís and Baháʼís as a signal moment that demonstrated that Islamic Sharia law had been abrogated and superseded by Bábí law as well as a key demonstration of the thrust of raising the social position of women. Although the unveiling led to accusations of immorality by a Christian missionary and Muslim clerics of the time, the Báb responded by supporting her position and endorsing the name Baháʼu'lláh gave her at the conference: the Pure (Táhirih).

=== Other aspects ===
Baháʼís have noted there is a synchronicity in time and a likeness in theme and events between Iran and the United States between the conference at Badasht and the Seneca Falls Convention. First: the conferences happened nearly coincident - at Badasht over three weeks from late June to mid July 1848 and the Seneca Falls Convention happening narrowly in mid July. Second: both conferences had women (Táhirih and Elizabeth Cady Stanton) take strong stances on the role of women in the public arena that some attending reacted to harshly. And lastly leading men present (Quddús and Frederick Douglas) supported these calls before the meeting adjourned, healing the breach. Some even see a parallel in the background discussions that are partially documented to arrange how things would be brought up and settled.

== See also ==
- Battle of Fort Tabarsi one of the other major events of the Bábí period.
- Baháʼí Faith and gender equality
- Baháʼí Faith in Iran
