= Andrew Mango =

Author on Turkish topics (1926–2014)

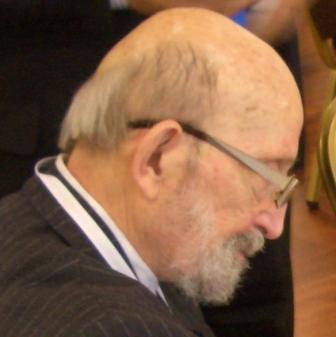
- Mango in 2009 at a conference in Ankara, Turkey
- Born: 14 June 1926; Istanbul, Turkey
- Died: 6 July 2014 (aged 88); London, United Kingdom
- Education: English High School for Boys
- Alma mater: SOAS, University of London
- Occupation: Author
- Writing career
- Language: English, Turkish
- Notable awards: Order of Merit of the Republic of Turkey (1998)

Andrew James Alexander Mango (14 June 1926 – 6 July 2014) was a British BBC employee and author.

== Biography ==
Andrew Mango was born in Istanbul, one of three sons of Alexander Mango, an Italian-Greek barrister and his White Russian wife Adelaide Damonov; the Byzantinist Cyril Mango was his younger brother. He was brought up in Istanbul and mastered a number of languages. Mango graduated from the English High School for Boys in Istanbul. He held degrees from the School of Oriental and African Studies, University of London, including a doctorate in Persian literature. He moved to the United Kingdom in 1947 and lived in London until his death.

== Career ==
Mango worked as a press officer in the British Embassy in Ankara. He joined the BBC World Service as a student and spent his entire career in the External Services, rising to be Turkish Programme Organiser and then Head of the South European Service. He retired in 1986. He died at the age of 88 on 6 July 2014. His death was announced by Richard Moore, the British Ambassador to Turkey.

== Works ==
- Turkey (1968)
- Discovering Turkey (1971)
- Turkey: The Challenge of a New Role (1994)
- Atatürk: The Biography of the Founder of Modern Turkey (1999). Persian translation by Hooshmand Dehghan (2015).
- The Turks Today (2004)
- Turkey and the War on Terrorism (2005)
- From the Sultan to Atatürk — Turkey (2009)

His background in Persian and Arabic studies allowed Mango to master Ottoman Turkish. He wrote his PhD thesis at the SOAS on Alexander the Great. He later, throughout his career, would also lecture as a guest and advise on modern Turkish studies.

Mango published his first book in 1968, while he was working for the BBC. After his retirement, his productivity increased. His book on Kemal Atatürk, from 1999, established an international reputation. The biography was notably translated into Persian by Hooshmand Dehghan and has been reprinted several times in Iran.

== Sources ==
- Barchard, David, "The Brothers Mango", Cornucopia Magazine No 19, Winter 1999 (excerpt).
- Christopher de Bellaigue, Article about Mango, New York Review of Books
- Finkel, Caroline, Osman's Dream, (Basic Books, 2005), 57; "Istanbul was only adopted as the city's official name in 1930."
- Sanberk, Özdem, "Obituary for Andrew Mango (1926-2014)" Hürriyet Daily News 8 July 2014.
