= Julia Isbrücker =

Dutch esperantist (1887–1971)

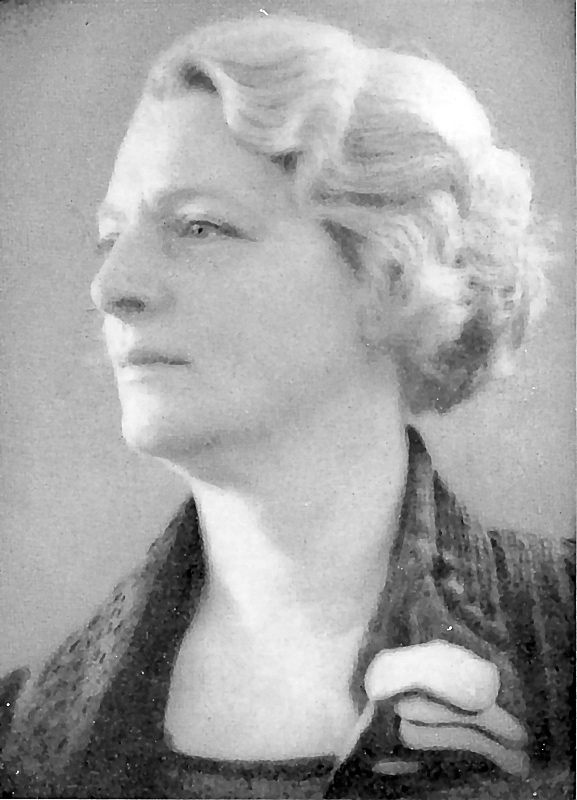
Julia Isbrucker

Julia Catharina Isbrücker-Dirksen (22 September 1887 - 14 January 1971) was a Dutch esperantist, Honorary Member of the Universal Esperanto Association (UEA), member of the International Central Committee and of the examination committee, member of the Soroptimist Club, president of the group in The Hague and wife of the vice-president of UEA Johannes Rijk Gerardus Isbrücker.

== Career ==
Isbrücker was an esperantist from 1909, soon after she wrote an Esperanto textbook with her brother. The development of the movement benefited from her initiative to invite the 12th Universal Congress in 1920 to the Hague, as at that time after World War I it was difficult to find a suitable city to host the Universal Congress. She organized the International Interfaith Conference in the Hague in 1928, founded with Andreo Cseh the International Cseh Institute in 1930 (later the International Esperanto Institute). Within its framework she organized courses, seminars, lecture evenings and other events. Starting in 1923, she was also the first president of the smaller organization Universal Esperantist Pacifist League (Einar Dahl was a later president).

In 1931 the mayor of Arnhem (Netherlands) provided a large house with a park, where the institute founded the Esperanto House. Thanks to Isbrücker it has become an international Esperanto Center, where a variety of programs, courses, meetings and conferences, most often international, have taken place on a regular basis.

Isbrücker was also a member of an examination committee, a member of the International Central Committee (ICK), president of the Hague Esperanto club "Fine ili venkos", she led courses and gave lectures in various non-Esperanto circles. In 1939 she became secretary of a newly founded Dutch Committee for the practical application of Esperanto, whose members were the mayor of The Hague and directors of a bank, a tourist office, PTT, Philips and KLM.

After the World War II, when the house in Arnhem was destroyed, Isbrücker devoted herself to a new business. With Andreo Cseh she founded the Universal League, a world federation based on the work of Clarence K. Streit. The official language was Esperanto, but non-Esperantists could also join. Since then she represented Universal League in international world federal congresses and conferences. She created a favorable attitude towards Esperanto in a wide range of circles.

In the meantime she wrote and translated extensively, primarily for the newspaper The Practice, which she collaborated with since its founding in 1932 and which became the official organ of the Universal League. She also translated to Esperanto, among others the work of Rico Bulthuis The Other Past and the work of Martin Kojc, The textbook of life.

== Works ==
- Report of the Constituent Assembly of the Peoples (1951)
- Vertaalde Esperanto exam tasks (1931)
- Wereldvrede en Esperanto (En: Jubileumboek 1926–1931)
- Esperanto exam tasks (1922)
- Esperanto exam tasks for diploma A and B with translation (1934)
- Vertaalde Esperanto-examinationopgaven (1923)
- Julia Isbrücker Pioniro de Esperanto, Vienna, 2021 (Esperanto and English). ISBN 978 3 903247 36 9

== Honors ==
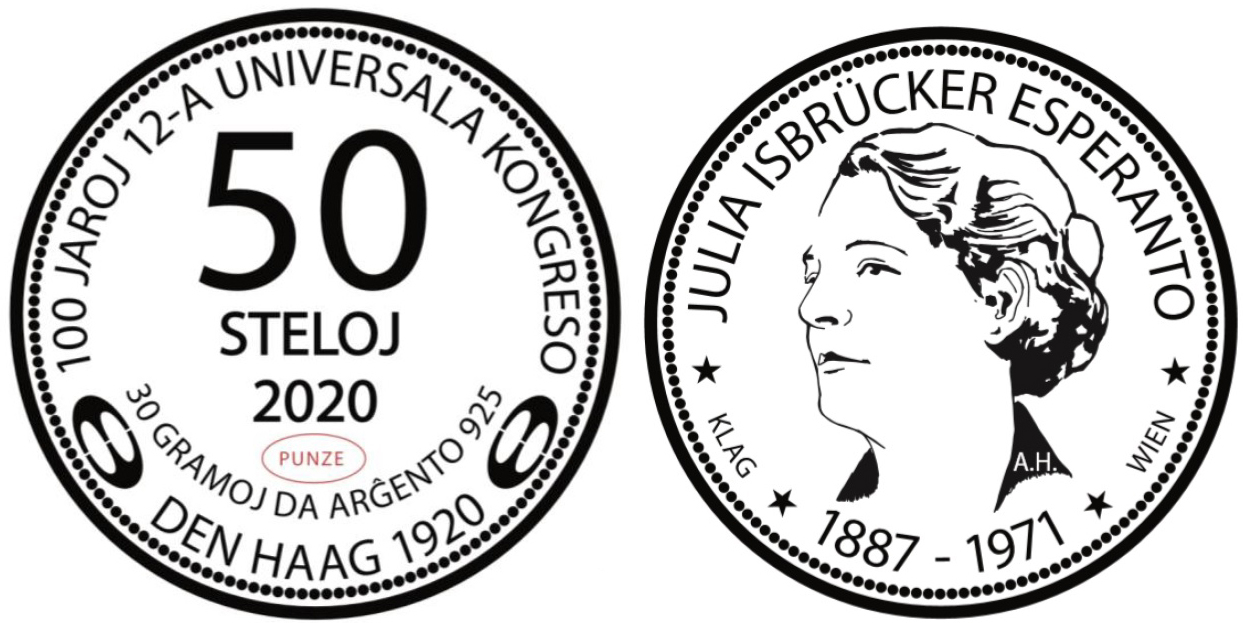
50 Steloj

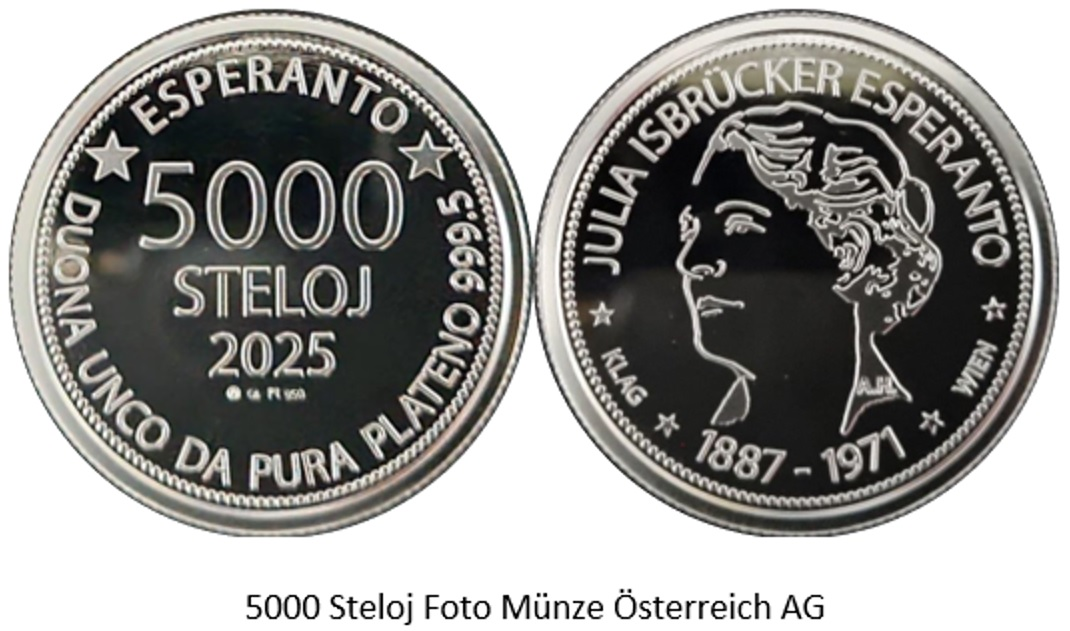

In 2020 a commemorative silver coin with the portrait of Julia Isbrücker was issued by Walter Klag, Austria, with a value of 50 steloj. The coin was designed by Helmut Andexlinger, the chief designer of Münze Österreich (Austria's state mint), 2020. Julia Isbrücker Pioniro de Esperanto, Vienna, 2021 (Esperanto and English). ISBN 978 3 903247 36 9
