= Adam Alter =

Psychologist, author, and expert on smartphone addiction

Adam Alter is a marketing author who also teaches at New York University Stern School of Business.

== Early life ==
Adam moved with his family from South Africa to Australia in the 1980s.

== Education and work ==
Alter obtained a scholarship to study actuarial science at the University of New South Wales, but switched to psychology and law.

Alter earned his Bachelor of Science from University of New South Wales and M.A. and Ph.D at Princeton University.

His book Irresistible (2017) has received positive reviews by the Chicago Tribune, saying it "explores the roots of our tech addiction," The Washington Post saying "enjoyable yet alarming," Publishers Weekly and The Guardian, saying "illuminating on the ways that designers engineer behavioral addiction." In an interview with The New York Times, Alter pointed out that many "Silicon Valley titans refuse to let their kids near certain devices" and that was his motivation to write the book. Speaking to the APA Monitor, Alter revealed his from his conversations with other psychologists, he learned that communicating via electronic devices had become the default option for many young people, a fact that contributes to their mental problems. He told The New Yorker that the parents and teenagers he surveyed generally expressed unease with social media, in part because they faced peer pressure to use it.

== Media appearances ==
In August 2017, Alter appeared on the PBS Newshour explaining why smartphones can be so addictive and why it is worth reducing usage.

== Publications ==
- Alter, Adam L. Drunk Tank Pink: And Other Unexpected Forces That Shape How We Think, Feel, and Behave. Penguin Press, 2013. ISBN 978-0143124931.
- Alter, Adam L. Irresistible: The Rise of Addictive Technology and the Business of Keeping Us Hooked. Penguin Press, 2017. ISBN 978-0735222847.
- Alter, Adam L. Anatomy of a Breakthrough: How to Get Unstuck When it Matters Most. Simon and Schuster, 2023. ISBN 1982182989.
