= Bábism =

Messianic movement founded by the Báb

Bábism (Note: The endonymic name for the faith is Dín-i-Bayán (Persian: دين بيان), meaning "religion of Bayán", itself a Qur'anic reference. The endonym is used by the contemporary Bábís in both Persian and English, however, Bábism is its standardized English name in academia and elsewhere outside the community.) (Persian: بابیه, romanized: Bâbiyye) is a messianic movement founded in 1844 by the Báb. The Báb, an Iranian merchant-turned-prophet, professed that there is one incorporeal, unknown, and incomprehensible God who manifests his will in an unending series of theophanies, called Point (Arabic: نقطة, romanized: nuqta) in Bábí terminology. The Báb's revelation, throughout which there was much evolution as he progressively outlined his teachings, was turbulent and short-lived and ended with his public execution in Tabriz in 1850. A campaign of extermination followed, in which thousands of followers were killed in what has been described as potentially one of the bloodiest actions of the Qajar Iranian military in the 19th century.

According to current estimates, Bábism has no more than a few thousand adherents, most of whom are concentrated in Iran, but it has persisted into the modern era in the form of the Bahá'í Faith, to which the majority of Bábís eventually converted.

Bábism flourished in Iran until 1852, then lingered on in exile in the Ottoman Empire, especially Cyprus, as well as underground in Iran. An anomaly amongst Islamic messianic movements, the Bábí movement signaled a break with Shia Islam, beginning a new religious system with its own unique laws, teachings, and practices. While Bábism was violently opposed by both clerical and government establishments, it led to the founding of the Bahá'í Faith, whose followers consider the religion founded by the Báb as a predecessor to their own.

== Etymology ==
The name Báb (lit. 'Gate') is a reference to the gate to the Twelfth Imam.

Bábism, a term originating from Orientalists rather than the followers of the religion, comes from the Arabic noun bāb "gate" (Arabic: باب). Additionally, Bayání comes from the Semitic root ب ي ن, which forms a class of words relating to concepts of clarity, differentiation, and separation, including Bayán, which can refer to explanation, commentary, or exposition as well as the branch of Arabic rhetoric dealing with metaphors and interpretation.

== History ==
=== Antecedents ===
Twelver Shia Muslims regard the Twelfth Imam, Muhammad al-Mahdi, as the last of the Imams. They contend that Muhammad al-Mahdi went into the Occultation in 874 CE, at which time communication between the Imam and the Muslim community could only be performed through mediators called bābs ('gates') or nā'ibs ('representatives'). In 940, the fourth nā'ib claimed that Imam Muhammad al-Mahdi had gone into an indefinite "Major Occultation", and that he would cease to communicate with the people. According to Twelver belief, the Hidden Imam is alive in the world, but in concealment from his enemies, and will only emerge shortly before the Last Judgment. At that time, acting as Qa'im Al Muhammad ("He who will arise"), a messianic figure also known as the Mahdi ("He who is rightly guided"), the Hidden Imam will start a holy war against evil, would defeat the unbelievers, and would start a reign of justice.

In 1830s Qajar Persia, Kazim Rashti was the leader of the Shaykhis, a sect of Twelvers. The Shaykhis were a group expecting the imminent appearance of al-Qāʾim. At the time of Kazim's death in 1843, he had counselled his followers to leave their homes to seek the Lord of the Age whose advent would soon break on the world.

=== Origin ===
The room in the Báb's house in Shiraz where he declared his mission to Mulla Husayn.

On 22 May 1844, Mullá Husayn, of Boshruyeh in Khorasan, a prominent disciple of Sayyid Kāẓim, entered Shiraz following the instruction by his master to search for al-Qā'im. Soon after he arrived in Shiraz, Mullá Husayn came into contact with the Báb. On the night of 22 May 1844, Mulla Husayn was invited by the Báb to his home; on that night Mullá Husayn told him that he was searching for the possible successor to Sayyid Kāẓim, al-Qā'im, and the Báb told Mullá Husayn privately that he was Sayyid Kāẓim's successor and the bearer of divine knowledge. Through the night of the 22nd to dawn of the 23rd, Mullá Husayn became the first to accept the Báb's claims as the gateway to Truth and the initiator of a new prophetic cycle; the Báb had replied in a satisfactory way to all of Mullá Husayn's questions and had written in his presence, with extreme rapidity, a long commentary on the surah of Yusuf, which has come to be known as the Qayyūmu l-Asmā' and is often considered the Báb's first revealed work, though he had before then composed a commentary on Surat al-Fatihah and Surat al-Baqara. This night and the following day are observed in the Bahá'í Faith as a holy day since then.

After Mullá Husayn accepted the Báb's claim, the Báb ordered him to wait until 17 others had independently recognized the station of the Báb before they could begin teaching others about the new revelation.

Within five months, seventeen other disciples of Sayyid Kāẓim had independently recognized the Báb as a Manifestation of God. Among them was one woman, Zarrin Tāj Baraghāni, a poet, who later received the name of Táhirih (the Pure). These 18 disciples were later to be known as the Letters of the Living and were given the task of spreading the new faith across Iran and Iraq. The Báb emphasized the spiritual station of these 18 individuals, who along with himself, made the first "Unity" of his religion.

After his declaration, he soon assumed the title of the Báb. Within a few years the movement spread all over Iran, causing controversy. His claim was at first understood by some of the public at the time to be merely a reference to the Gate of the Hidden Imám of Muhammad, but this understanding he publicly disclaimed. He later proclaimed himself, in the presence of the heir to the Throne of Persia and other notables, to be al-Qā'im. In the Báb's writings, the Báb appears to identify himself as the gate (báb) to Muhammad al-Mahdi and later he begins to explicitly proclaim his station as equivalent to that of the Hidden Imam and a new messenger from God. Saiedi states the exalted identity the Báb was claiming was unmistakable, but due to the reception of the people, his writings appear to convey the impression that he is only the gate to the Hidden Twelfth Imam. To his circle of early believers, the Báb was equivocal about his exact status, gradually confiding in them that he was not merely a gate to the Hidden Imam, but the Manifestation of the Hidden Imam and al-Qā'im himself. During his early meetings with Mullá Husayn, the Báb described himself as the Master and the Promised One; he did not consider himself just Sayyid Kāẓim Rashti's successor, but claimed a prophetic status, with a sense of deputyship delegated to him not just from the Hidden Imam, but from Divine authority. His early texts, such as the Commentary on the Sura of Yusuf, used Qur'anic language that implied divine authority and identified himself effectively with the Imam. When Mullā ʿAlī Basṭāmī, the second Letter of the Living, was put on trial in Baghdad for preaching about the Báb, the clerics studied the Commentary on the Sura of Yusuf, recognized in it a claim to divine revelation, and quoted from it extensively to prove that the author had made a messianic claim.

=== Spread ===
The Babi movement [...] [became] an important catalyst of social progressiveness in mid-nineteenth-century Iran, promoting interreligious peace, social equality between the sexes and revolutionary anti-monarchism. Babism was a reflection of an older Iran that had been mass-producing messiahs in opposition to mainstream Islam since the seventh century [...] And yet the new current was also a product of Iran's grappling with novelty and change, and [the Babi movement] went on to present a vision of modernity that was based on secularism, internationalism, and the rejection of war. It is this vision which has enabled it to survive to the present day – as Bahaism, which emerged from Babism in the late nineteenth century – in pockets and communities peopled by 5 million souls, and which qualifies it for inclusion in any narrative about modernisation in the Middle East.

The Báb's message was disseminated by the Letters of the Living through Iran and southern Iraq. One of these initial activities was communicated to the West starting 8 January 1845 as an exchange of diplomatic reports concerning the fate of Mullá ʻAlíy-i-Bastámí, the second Letter. These were exchanges between Sir Henry Rawlinson, 1st Baronet who wrote first to Stratford Canning, 1st Viscount Stratford de Redcliffe. Followups continued until in 1846 he was sentenced by the Ottomans to serve in the naval shipyards at hard labor—the Ottoman ruler refusing to banish him as it would be "difficult to control his activities and prevent him spreading his false ideas." Separately each of the Letters and other early believers were sent on various missions to begin public presentations of the new religion. Indeed various activities the Báb initiated were devolved to various Letters of the Living like preaching activities and answering questions from the community. In particular, as these first public activities multiplied, opposition by the Islamic clergy arose and prompted the Governor of Shiraz to order the Báb's arrest. The Báb, upon hearing of the arrest order, left Bushehr for Shiraz in June 1845 and presented himself to the authorities. This series of events become the first public account of the new religion in the West when they were published 1 November 1845 in The Times of London. The story was also carried from 15 November by the Literary Gazette which was subsequently echoed widely. Meanwhile the Báb was placed under house arrest at the home of his uncle, and was restricted in his personal activities, until a cholera epidemic broke out in the city in September 1846.

The Báb was released and departed for Isfahan. There, many came to see him at the house of the imám jum'ih, head of the local clergy, who became sympathetic. After an informal gathering where the Báb debated the local clergy and displayed his speed in producing instantaneous verses, his popularity soared. After the death of the Governor of Isfahan, Manouchehr Khan Gorji, an Iranian Georgian, who had become his supporter, pressure from the clergy of the province led to the Shah, Mohammad Shah Qajar, ordering the Báb to Tehran in January 1847. After spending several months in a camp outside Tehran, and before the Báb could meet the Shah, the Prime Minister sent the Báb to Tabriz in the northwestern corner of the country, and later Maku and Chehriq, where he was confined. During his confinement, he was said to have impressed his jailers with his patience and dignity. Communication between the Báb and his followers was not completely severed but was quite difficult, and more responsibilities were devolved to the Letters as he was not able to elucidate his teachings to the public. With Bábí teachings now mostly spread by his followers, they faced increasing persecution themselves.

The role played by Táhirih in Karbalāʾ was particularly significant. She began an effort of innovation in religion based on her station as a Letter of the Living and the incarnation of Fatimah. In his early teachings, the Báb emphasized observing sharia and extraordinary acts of piety. However, his claim of being the Báb, i.e. the authority direct from God, was in conflict with this more conservative position of supporting sharia. Táhirih innovated an advance in the understanding of the priority of the Báb's station above that of Islamic sharia by wedding the concept of the Báb's overriding religious authority with ideas originating in Shaykhism pointing to an age after outward conformity. She seems to have made this connection c. 1262/1846 even before the Báb himself. The matter was taken up by the community at large at the Conference of Badasht.

This conference was one of the most important events of the Bábí movement when in 1848 its split from Islam and Islamic law was made clear. Three key individuals who attended the conference were Bahá'u'lláh, Quddús, and Táhirih. Táhirih, during the conference, was able to persuade many of the others about the Bábí split with Islam based on the station of the Báb and an age after outward conformity. She appeared at least once during the conference in public without a veil, heresy within the Islamic world of that day, signalling the split. During this same month the Báb was brought to trial in Tabriz and made his claim to be the Mahdi public to the Crown Prince and the Shi'a clergy.

Several sources agree that by 1848 or 1850 there were 100,000 converts to Babism. In the fall of 1850 newspaper coverage fell behind quickly unfolding events. Though the Báb was named for the first time he had in fact already been executed.

=== Uprisings and massacres ===
By 1848 the increased fervour of the Bábís and the clerical opposition had led to a number of confrontations between the Bábís and their government and clerical establishment. After the death of Mohammad Shah Qajar, the shah of Iran, a series of armed struggles and uprisings broke out in the country, including at Tabarsi. These confrontations all resulted in Bábí massacres; Bahá'í authors give an estimate of 20,000 Bábís killed from 1844 to present, with most of the deaths occurring during the first 20 years. The first major killings of Bábís recorded in history took place in Qazvin. Since then, attacks against the Bábís by prominent clerics and their followers became more common and some Bábís started to carry arms. In remote and isolated places the scattered Bábís were readily attacked and killed while in places where large numbers of them resided they acted in self-defense. One of these attacks occurred in Babol of Mazandaran which led to the death of several Bábís and their opponents, as well as an armed conflict between Bábís and their enemies in fort Ṭabarsí. After that, two other big clashes between the Bábís and their opponents took place in the cities of Zanjan and Neyriz in the north and south of Iran, respectively, as well as a smaller conflict in Yazd. A total of several thousand Bábís were killed in these conflicts. In the three main conflicts in Ṭabarsí, Zanjan and Neyriz, Bábís were accused by their enemies of revolting against the government. However, it seems unlikely that these actions were purely revolutionary. In all three cases, the battles that took place were of a defensive nature, and not considered an offensive jihad, as the Báb did not allow it and in the case of two urban conflicts (Neyriz and Zanjan), they were related to pre-existing social and political tensions within the towns. There is also no evidence of a coordinated plan of action. In mid-1850 a new prime-minister, Amir Kabir, was convinced that the Bábí movement was a threat and ordered the execution of the Báb which was followed by the killings of many Bábís.

==== Fort Tabarsi ====
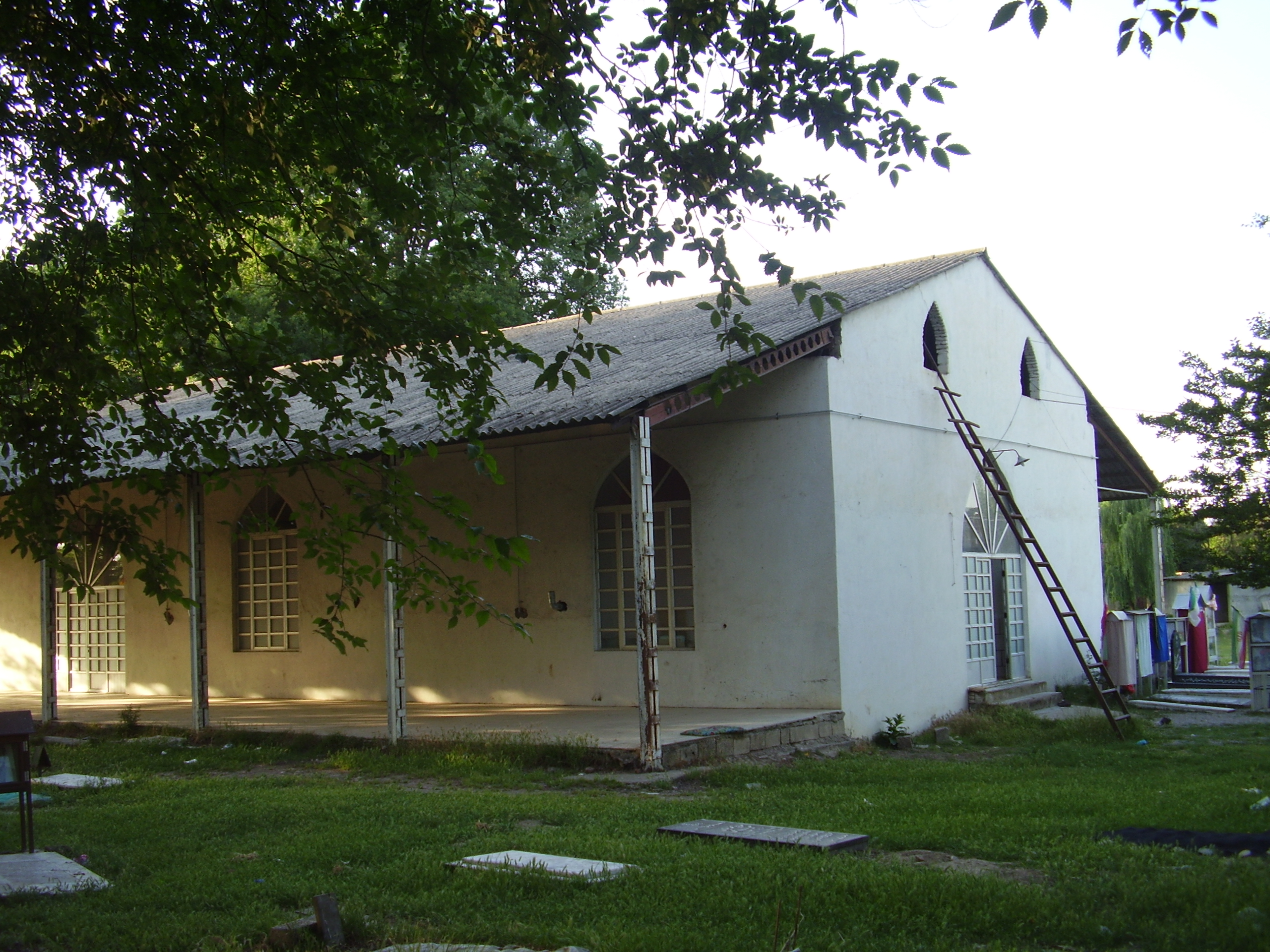
Shrine of Shaykh Ṭabarsí

Of the conflicts between the Bábís and the establishment, the first and best known took place in Māzandarān at the remote shrine of Shaykh Tabarsi, about 22 kilometres (14 mi) southeast of Bārfarush (modern Babol). From October 1848 until May 1849, around 300 Bábís (later rising to 600), led by Quddús and Mullá Husayn, defended themselves against the attacks of local villagers and members of the Shah's army under the command of Prince Mahdi Qoli Mirza. They were, after being weakened through attrition and starvation, subdued through false promises of safety, and put to death or sold into slavery.

==== Zanjan upheaval ====
The revolt at the fortress of ʿAli Mardan Khan in Zanjan in northwest Iran was by far the most violent of all the conflicts. It was headed by Mullā Muhammad 'Ali Zanjani, called Hujjat, and also lasted seven or eight months (May 1850–January 1851). The Bábí community in the city had swelled to around 3,000 after the conversion of one of the town's religious leaders to the Bábí movement. The conflict was preceded by years of growing tension between the leading Islamic clergy and the new rising Bábí leadership. The city governor ordered that the city be divided into two sectors, with hostilities starting soon thereafter. The Bábís faced resistance against a large number of regular troops, and led to the death of several thousand Bábís. After Hujjat was killed, and the Bábí numbers being greatly reduced, the Bábís surrendered in January 1851 and were massacred by the army.

==== Nayriz upheaval ====
Meanwhile, a serious but less protracted struggle was waged against the government at Neyriz in Fars by Yahya Vahid Darabi of Nayriz. Vahid had converted around 1500 people in the community and had thus caused tensions with the authorities which led to an armed struggle in a nearby fort. The Bábís resisted attacks by the town's governor as well as further reinforcements. After being given a truce offer on 17 June 1850, Vahid told his followers to give up their positions, which led to Vahid and the Bábís being killed; the Bábí section of the town was also plundered, and the property of the remaining Bábís seized. Later, in March 1853 the governor of the city was killed by the Bábís. These further events led to a second armed conflict near the city where the Bábís once again resisted troop attacks until November 1853, when a massacre of Bábís happened, with their women being enslaved.

=== After the execution of the Báb ===
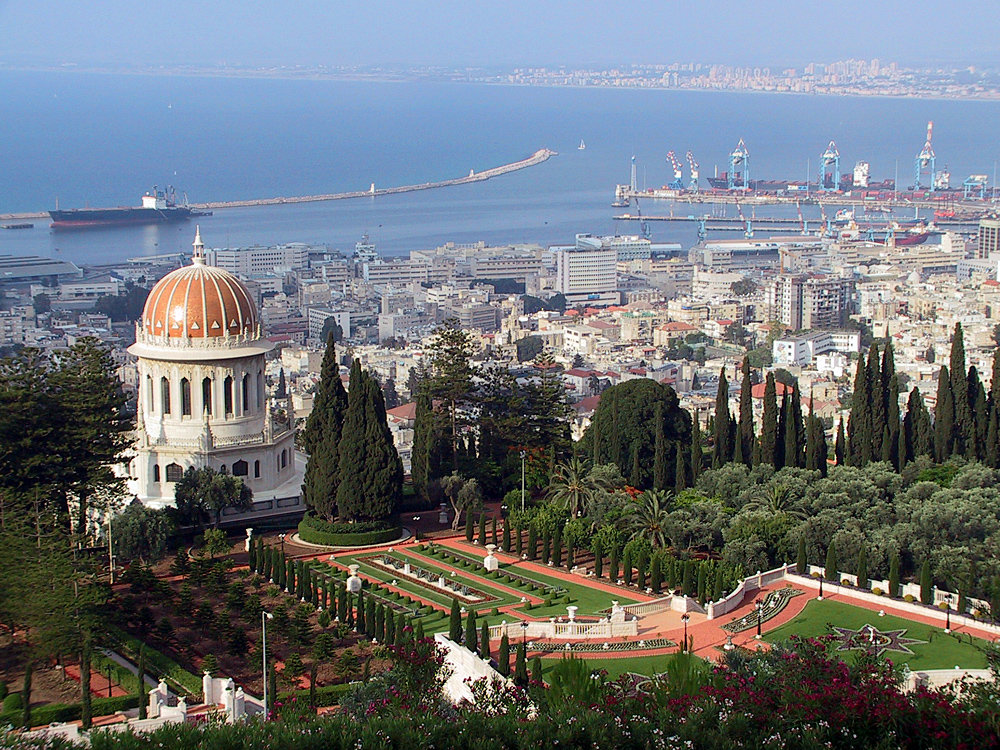
The Shrine of the Báb in Haifa

The revolts in Zanjan and Nayriz were in progress when in 1850 the Báb, with one of his disciples, was brought from his prison at Chehriq citadel, which was called jabal alshadid, meaning 'mount extreme', by the Báb, to Tabriz and publicly shot in front of the citadel. The body, after being exposed for some days, was recovered by the Bábís and conveyed to a shrine near Tehran, whence it was ultimately removed to Haifa, where it is now enshrined.

Most Western scholars who reviewed the Faith of the Báb after 1860 saw it as a way of letting in Western and Christian ideals into "a closed and rigid Moslem system" and gave the Báb himself sometimes less or more credit for being authentic in the process. However, some went further. In 1866 British diplomat Robert Grant Watson (1834–1892) published a history of the first 58 years of the 19th century of Persia and would serve in several diplomatic capacities. Watson summarizes the impact of the Báb in Persia:

Bábism, though at present a proscribed religion in Persia, is far from being extinct, or even declining, and the Báb may yet contest with Mahomed (sic) the privilege of being regarded as the real prophet of the faithful. Bábism in its infancy was the cause of a greater sensation than that even which was produced by the teaching of Jesus, if we may judge from the account of Josephus of the first days of Christianity.

Latter commentators also noted these kinds of views: Ernest Renan, Stephen Greenleaf Bulfinch, son of Charles Bulfinch, and others.

For the next two years comparatively little was heard of the Bábís. The Bábís became polarized with one group speaking of violent retribution against Naser al-Din Shah Qajar and the Qajar State, while the other, under the leadership of Baha'u'lláh, looked to reconsolidate the community, rebuild relationships with the government and advance the Babí cause by persuasion and the example of virtuous living.

The militant group of Bábís was between thirty and seventy persons, only a small number of the total Bábí population of perhaps 100,000. Their meetings appear to have come under the control of a "Husayn Jan", an emotive and magnetic figure who obtained a high degree of personal devotion to himself from the group. Meanwhile, Tahirih and Baha'u'lláh, visible leaders of the community previously, were removed from the scene – Tahirih by arrest and in the case of Baha'u'lláh an 'invitation', by order of Amir Kabir, to go on pilgrimage to Karbila. On 15 August 1852, three from this small splinter group, acting on their own initiative, attempted to assassinate Naser al-Din Shah Qajar as he was returning from the chase to his palace at Niavarān. Notwithstanding the assassins' claim that they were working alone, the entire Bábí community was blamed, and a mass slaughter of thousands of Bábís followed, starting on 31 August 1852 with some thirty Bábís, including Táhirih. Dr Jakob Eduard Polak, then the Shah's physician, was an eye-witness to her execution. Bahá'u'lláh surrendered himself and he along with a few others were imprisoned in the Siāhchāl ('Black Pit'), an underground dungeon in Tehran. Meanwhile, echoes of the newspaper coverage of the violence continued into 1853.

=== Bahá'í–Azali split ===
In most of his prominent writings, the Báb alluded to a Promised One, most commonly referred to as "He whom God shall make manifest", and that he himself was "but a ring upon the hand of Him Whom God shall make manifest." Within 20 years of the Báb's death, over 25 people claimed to be the Promised One, most significantly Bahá'u'lláh.

Shortly before the Báb's execution, a follower of the Báb, Abd al-Karim, brought to the Báb's attention the necessity to appoint a successor; thus the Báb wrote a certain number of tablets which he gave to Abd al-Karim to deliver to Subh-i Azal and Bahá'u'lláh. These tablets were later interpreted by both Azalis and Bahá'ís as proof of the Báb's delegation of leadership. 'Abdu'l-Bahá stated that the Báb did this at the suggestion of Bahá'u'lláh. In one of the tablets, which is commonly referred to as the Will and Testament of the Báb, Subh-i Azal is viewed to have been appointed as leader of the Bábís after the death of the movement's founder. The tablet, in verse 27, orders Subh-i Azal "...to obey Him Whom God Shall Make Manifest, and in verse 37 to "protect yourself, then protect yourself, then protect what is revealed in the Bayan followed by what is revealed from your presence." At the time of the apparent appointment Subh-i Azal was still a teenager, had never demonstrated leadership in the Bábí movement, and was still living in the house of his older brother, Bahá'u'lláh.

Subh-i Azal's leadership was controversial. He generally absented himself from the Bábí community spending his time in Baghdad in hiding and disguise; and even went so far as to publicly disavow allegiance to the Báb on several occasions. Subh-i Azal gradually alienated himself from a large proportion of the Bábís who started to give their alliance to other claimants. During the time that both Bahá'u'lláh and Subh-i-Azal were in Baghdad, since Subh-i Azal remained in hiding, Bahá'u'lláh performed much of the daily administration of the Bábí affairs.

Bahá'u'lláh claimed that in 1853, while a prisoner in Tehran, he was visited by a "Maid of Heaven", which symbolically marked the beginning of his mission as a Messenger of God. Ten years later in Baghdad, he made his first public declaration to be "He whom God shall make manifest" to a small number of followers, and in 1866 he made the claim public. Bahá'u'lláh's claims threatened Subh-i Azal's position as leader of the religion since it would mean little to be leader of the Bábís if "Him Whom God Shall Make Manifest" were to appear and start a new religion. Subh-i-Azal responded by making his own claims, but his attempt to preserve the traditional Bábism was largely unpopular, and his followers became the minority.

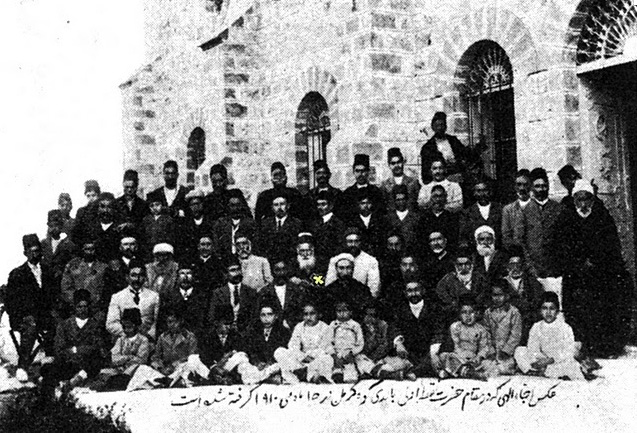
A Baha'i community in Iran

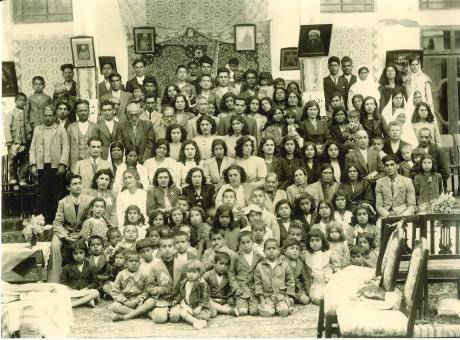
An Azali community in Iran

Eventually Bahá'u'lláh was recognized by the vast majority of Bábís as "He whom God shall make manifest" and his followers began calling themselves Bahá'ís. By 1908, there were probably from half a million to a million Bahá'ís, and at most only a hundred followers of Subh-i Azal. According to Ali Raza Naqavi, Bábism and the Bahá'í Faith are "almost inseparable" and have "almost identical beliefs and doctrines." He writes that in the way Muslims view Judaism as having been abrogated by Christianity and Christianity as having been abrogated by Islam, Bahá'ís view Bábism as having been abrogated and replaced by the Bahá'í Faith.

Subh-i Azal died in Famagusta, Cyprus in 1912, and his followers are known as Azalis or Azali Bábis. Denis MacEoin notes that after the deaths of those Azali Babis who were active in the Persian Constitutional Revolution, the Azali form of Babism entered a stagnation from which it has not recovered as there is no acknowledged leader or central organization.

In 2001, Azalis were estimated to number no more than a few thousand, living mainly in Iran.

== Beliefs and teachings ==
The Báb's teachings can be grouped into three broad stages which each have a dominant thematic focus. His earliest teachings are primarily defined by his interpretation of the Quran and other Islamic traditions. While this interpretive mode continues throughout all three stages of his teachings, a shift takes place where his emphasis moves to the philosophical elucidation and finally to legislative pronouncements. In the second philosophical stage, the Báb gives an explanation of the metaphysics of being and creation, and in the third legislative stage his mystical and historical principles are explicitly united. An analysis of the Báb's writings throughout the three stages shows that all of his teachings were animated by a common principle that had multiple dimensions and forms.

The teachings of the Báb give new meanings to the notions of God, religion, and prophets, and interprets religious concepts such as heaven and hell and resurrection accordingly. Progressive revelation, continuity and renewal of religion, improving the status of women, abolishing priesthood, and emphasizing on human nobility are among some of the important teachings of the Báb. Yet another fundamental focus of his teachings is his emphasis on the advent of a messianic figure that he frequently refers to as "he whom God shall make manifest". The Báb always discusses his own revelation and laws in the context of this promised figure. Unlike previous religions that the reference to promised figures were only occasional and in hints and allusions, the main focus of Bayan, the mother book of the Bábí dispensation, is preparing the way for "he whom God shall make manifest".

=== God and prophets ===
The Báb emphasizes on the absolute transcendence of God and rejects any anthropomorphic conception of him. The Báb states that God is unknowable, indescribable, inaccessible to the world, but he reveals himself through prophets to humanity out of his love for them. This teaching of the Báb continue as a key principle of the Bahá'í Faith. (see God in the Baháʼí Faith). It is through their recognition that God can be known and they are the supreme manifestations of God in the world. According to the writings of the Báb there is a unity among prophets of God. They resemble pure mirrors, that while being diverse, reflect the same sun (a metaphor for the one God) in themselves. The writings of the Báb emphasize that there is no end to the revelation of God, and new religions and prophets will appear forever throughout history.

=== Progressive revelation ===
One of the most fundamental teachings of the Báb is the continuity and evolution of religion. God gradually manifests himself to humanity through his prophets; and as humanity advances throughout history, divine teachings become more progressive and comprehensive. Each religion appears in response to the social needs of humanity at the time of its advent. It is more advanced compared to its predecessors, but its potential perfection is realized through the emergence of the next religion. According to this logic, there is no "final religion".

Resurrection then according to the Báb is not the end of world, but the decline of the old religion and its revival in the form of a new revelation. The Báb uses the metaphor of seasons to further explains this cyclical progression. "the tree of prophethood" blossoms in the spring, gains strength in the summer, and reaches fruition in the fall, and finally dies in the winter. The tree however is reborn and revived in the following spring. The tree changes and grows over time yet it is the same tree throughout. This concept of prophetic renewal carries a sense of historical relativism in it and acknowledges historical change. It calls implicitly for human agency rather than prophetic finality and promotes a forward-looking perspective. The Báb thus promotes an indigenous notion of modernity which relies on historical progression rather than the sanctity of the past.

According to the Báb, religion is a dialogical and relative phenomenon that is the product of the interaction of the will of God with the historical stage of the development of humanity. The Báb rejects the traditional concept of religion which portrays it as an absolute and eternally binding imposition of the will of God on humans. Religion is a dynamic and progressive reality similar to humanity. One of the most significant and central expressions of this dialectical and historical concept is the Báb's use of the term irtifá (Persian: ارتفاع) which carries two contradictory meaning; cancellation and elevation. Irtifá‘ conveys the same semantics as Hegel’s Aufhebung (to elevate/abolish). According to the Báb, each new religion is an irtifá‘ of the previous religion. The new religion is the negation and abrogation of the previous religion, yet at the same it is the same previous religion, which appears in a higher, more elevated form.

This notion of continuity and renewal anticipates future prophetic revelations after the Báb. More specifically the Báb states that the essence and purpose of his own mission, as he always stresses, is to prepare the people for the advent of a yet greater messianic figure that appears after him which he refers to as "he whom God shall make manifest".

According to the Báb, the word of God is alive and dynamic and wants to appear in its new form in conjunction with the evolution of mankind. He deeply regrets that religious traditionalists, out of their love for their divine book, prevent the evolution of the same book and reject its re-appearance in the next religious dispensation.

=== Resurrection, Judgment Day and cyclical revelation ===
The Báb taught that his revelation was beginning an apocalyptic process that was bringing the Islamic dispensation to its cyclical end, and starting a new dispensation. He taught that the terms "resurrection", "Judgement Day", "paradise" and "hell" used in Shiʻa prophecies for the end-times are symbolic. He stated that "Resurrection" means that the appearance of a new revelation, and that "raising of the dead" means the spiritual awakening of those who have stepped away from true religion. He further stated that "Judgement Day" refers to when a new Manifestation of God comes, and the acceptance or rejection of those on the Earth. Thus the Báb taught that with his revelation the end times ended and the age of resurrection had started and that the end-times were symbolic as the end of the past prophetic cycle. The Báb wrote: "Verily, the world and the hereafter are two spiritual states. If you turn towards God, exalted be He, then you are in paradise and if you are occupied with your self then you are in hell and in the world. Therefore understand these allusions."

In the Persian Bayán, the Báb wrote that religious dispensations come in cycles, as the seasons, to renew "pure religion" for humanity. This notion of continuity anticipated future prophetic revelations after the Báb.

=== He whom God shall make manifest ===
One of the core Bábí teachings is that a new prophet would soon come, whom the Báb termed He whom God shall make manifest (Arabic: من يظهر الله; Persian: مظهر کلّیه الهی), a messianic figure that would complete the revelation that the Báb begun. The Báb describes this messianic figure as the origin of all divine attributes, and states that his command is equivalent to God's command. Unlike earlier religions in which references to future promised figures were occasional and only in hints and allusions, the entirety of the Bayan, the mother book of the Bábí dispensation, is essentially a discourse on a messianic figure, even greater than himself, that the Báb refers to as "he Whom God shall make manifest". The Báb always discusses his own revelation and laws in the context of this promised figure. The essence and purpose of the Báb's own mission, as he always stressed, was to prepare the people for the advent of him. He asks his followers to independently investigate and look for the promised one, and recognize him out of his own intrinsic reality, works and attributes, and not due to any reasons external to him. He even warns them not to be deprived of the promised one by arguing against him from the works of the Báb, the same way the followers of the previous religions opposed the next prophet while citing their holy scriptures. Furthermore, the Báb speaks of the imminence of the advent of the promised one and refers to the time of his advent as year nine and nineteen. After the Báb's execution in 1850, there were some Bábis who claimed to be "He whom God shall make manifest". Later in 1863, nineteen years after the declaration of the Báb, Baháʼu'lláh privately laid claim to be the messianic figure, and made his claim publicly in 1866–1868. His claim was by far the most successful. The majority of the Bábis followed him and later became known as Baháʼís. The Azalis (those Babis who did not accept Baháʼu'lláh) objected to Baháʼu'lláh's statement.

=== Human nobility ===
The Báb sees humans as noble beings who are endowed with the inherent capacity to think for themselves and, therefore, are obligated to engage in the independent investigation of truth. This means that no human being should be dependent on others to investigate the spiritual truth. Two major expressions of this idea are the Báb's abolishment of priesthood and his emphasis on the words of revelation, not miracles, as the valid evidence of the legitimacy of the claims of a prophet.

The writings of the Báb eliminated the institution of clergy and prohibited anyone from mounting the pulpit. He finds such ascent, as well as the seating of the people beneath a cleric, as an insult to the dignity of all human beings. He also prohibits congregational prayer, which requires following a clerical leader of the prayer. According to the Báb, the worship of God does not require human mediation. Even when the Báb makes an exception in the case of the congregational prayer for the dead, He emphasizes that no one should stand ahead of others. All must stand in equal rows to honor the deceased.

According to the Báb, one of the main reasons for the corruption of religions in general is the clergy. The Báb also criticizes the practice of confessing sins to priests.

One of the central teachings of the Báb is that miracles, as the breaking of the laws of nature, has nothing to do with the mission of prophets, which is the spiritual and moral education of humanity. Therefore, miracles cannot prove the truth of prophethood. The Báb rejects Shia's obsessive preoccupation with miracles to foster rationalism, and remove superstition from religion. According to the Báb there is only one valid evidence for the legitimacy of a prophet, and that is the creative words of the prophet which address the needs of the time and bring a new culture, value system, and meaning to the lives of the people, transforms them and help them reach human perfection.

=== Improving the status of women ===
Most contemporary accounts agree that one of the main social impacts of the Bábí movement was the improvement of the status of women. The Báb generally treats women and men equally in his laws. He specifically alleviates some of the burdens that Islamic law had laid upon women; e.g. by adding a twelve-month delay to divorce, he makes it more difficult, he discourages polygamy, and forbids concubinage, forced marriage, men having intercourse with their wife without her permission, and men unilaterally divorcing their wives. He relaxes severe restrictions on women’s social intercourse, and orders men not to harm women. He orders men to treat women with the utmost love. On occasions, the Báb even gives women preference over men; for example, he sets a penalty for anyone who causes grief to another person, which he equates to causing grief to God, but he says that the penalty for causing grief to women is doubled.

The Báb teaches that, since God transcends the boundaries of male and female, God wishes that "neither men exalt themselves over women, nor women exalt themselves over men".

In one of his early works, the Báb states that everybody should treat women in "the best way of kindness", and wrote that harassing women, even to the extent of blinking an eye, is a violation of God's command.

The Báb encouraged the education of women and did not display a gender distinction in Bábí laws on education.

In addition to his writings, the Báb also showed that his religion wants to improve the situation of women by supporting his leading female disciple Tahereh. The Báb always praised Tahereh and approved of her activities that included her removing her hijab, advancing the claims of the Báb, and breaking the Bábí faith from Islam, even when some Bábís complained about them or opposed them. Shortly after the conference Badasht gathering, in which Tahereh played a central role, the Báb praised her in one of his writings and equated her to the totality of the remaining seventeen letters of the living. The letters of the living, which Tahereh is one of, are the first eighteen individuals who believed in the Báb, and for this reason, have the highest spiritual station in the dispensation of the Báb among his followers.

The teachings of the Báb on improving the status of women represented a significant departure from legal norms and social customs that were prevalent in parts of the Muslim world that have lingered even to the present day. Armin Eschraghi notes the context of 19th century Iran and that, "Modern western readers might not appreciate the revolutionary potential" of the teachings of Báb.

The Primal Will of God is personified as the female figure of the maid of heaven in the writings of the Bab.

=== Importance of education ===
The Báb emphasized rationality, science, and efficient education. Education has to be well organized and knowledge conveyed to children in a systematic way. According to the Báb, a progressive society is based on an efficient pedagogical approach, with well-organized schools. There are some key themes that must be thought about in the schools: ethical issues such as the importance of respect for other opinions and ideas; the relativity of spirituality; the methodology required to be free from past superstitions; the nobility of the role of humankind in the world civilization; and the promotion of respect and valuing the role of the women in the society. The Báb also considered natural sciences important, including biology, physics, and chemistry, as well as medicine. He proposed radical reform in the sphere of education. He recommended modernizing it by eliminating all obsolete themes such as Islamic law and religious logic. Moreover, he wanted to eliminate the use of complicated words and to make the language easier and less complicated.

The Báb encourages believers to be proactive in order to learn the sciences. In such a context, the Bāb recommended that teachers be attentive in their teaching methodology, recommending them to use kindness, patience, and particularly fantasy. The use of the game is fundamental in order to improve the learning process, The Báb says. He also recommended that teachers not use corporal punishment toward children. For this reason, The Bab devotes a part of his reflection on education to dissuading teachers from using violence toward the children. He recommended that teachers be very careful in their communication, as children’s souls are very delicate and they can easily be hurt in their childhood, and this might influence their behavior in society in the future. The Bāb thus promotes discipline in schools but forbids the use of violence. He clearly states in the Arabic part of Bayan: “Do not hit anyone, not ever.” At the same time, The Bab recommends that children and pupils should be respectful of their teachers, who are very important in society. It is the teachers who teach the children how to read and write and for this reason they have an enormous role in the process of civilization. Moreover, the Bāb recommends that parents should educate their children with attention, teaching them kindness. According to the Bāb, the main purpose of civilization is peaceful cohabitation, and this can be reached only through the use of kindness and the spread of gentle manners in society.

=== Ethics ===
The bulk of Persian Bayan elaborates on the basic ethical principle that, even if people wrong you, you must forgive them, do good to them, and behave toward them as God would when he gives grace to those who ungratefully repudiate Him. In short, they call for an inner spiritual transformation. One must be content with God, with the laws of God, with one's parents, and with oneself. The Báb calls for perfection and refinement in a variety of senses: in keeping rivers pure and unpolluted; in preserving the environment and not damaging the nature as it is the mirror of God; in producing crafts and goods of the highest quality; in building beautiful dwellings with doors high enough for even the tallest person to enter; in the creation of beautiful art; in bathing regularly; in wearing clean and spotless clothing; and in the spread of prosperity to all. He forbade causing grief and sadness to anyone and said this was "doubly binding" in the treatment of women, implying a new status of women in society. He also forbade the physical punishment and humiliation of children. The Báb saw all of these actions as expressions of the beauty and virtue of God in one's life and as forms of worship. He sought to spiritualize one's understanding of the world, including a symbolic description of time itself through the introduction of a calendar of nineteen months, each with nineteen days, with the days and months named after attributes of God. In short, the Báb sought to create an entirely new sort of community, one focused on unity, love, and service to others and one where there would be no role for violence, except perhaps occasionally in the restraint of criminals. According to the Báb, the main purpose of civilization is peaceful coexistence, and this can be reached only through the use of kindness and the spread of gentle manners in society.

Jack McLean, summarizing Nader Saiedi's analysis, writes that the Báb's writings "foresee current global issues of crisis, such as the protection of the environment and the commodification of natural resources". The Báb specifically calls for the absolute purity of water in the Bayán and as all substances return to the inland water table and the oceans, this could easily be seen as a general law for the protection of the environment. The Arabic Bayán also forbids the commodification of the four elements, earth, air, fire and water.

The Báb also foreshadowed later developments in media, by emphasizing the need for a rapid system of news communication, which would be available for all to access, no matter their wealth or social standing. He writes, regarding the news, that "until such a system is made universal, its benefit will not reach those servants of the kingdom unless there come a time when it will be accessible to all the people. Although today the kings have their own special couriers, this is fruitless, for the poor are deprived of such a service."

=== Aesthetics and Spiritual Refinement ===
The Báb also developed a distinct philosophy of aesthetics, which emphasized beauty and refinement (litafat) as governing principles, not only for art but for our actions, and stressed the need to bring all things to their highest state of perfection, or paradise (itqan). Saiedi writes that, "The Bab makes it clear that He wants His community to be the embodiment of perfection in all things. Furthermore, He defines beautification and excellence in art as the means of the spiritualization of the world." The Báb himself writes, using calligraphy as an example of a universal principle, "Should he know of a higher degree of refinement and fail to manifest it upon that paper, he would deprive it of its paradise, and he would be held accountable, for why hast thou, despite the possession of the means, withheld the effusion of grace and favor?"

=== Hidden Imam ===
In Twelver Shiʻa Islamic belief there were twelve Imams, the last of whom, known as Imam Mahdi, communicated with his followers only through certain representatives. According to the Twelver's belief, after the last of these representatives died, the Imam Mahdi went into a state of Occultation; while still alive, he was no longer accessible to his believers. Shiʻa Muslims believe that when the world becomes oppressed, the Imam Mahdi (also termed the Qa'im) will come out of occultation and restore true religion on Earth before the cataclysmic end of the world and judgement day.

In Bábí belief the Báb is the return of the Imam Mahdi, but the doctrine of the Occultation is implicitly denied; instead the Báb stated that his manifestation was a symbolic return of the Imam, and not the physical reappearance of the Imam Mahdi who had died a thousand years earlier. In Bábí belief the statements made from previous revelations regarding the Imam Mahdi were set forth in symbols. The Báb also stated that he was not only the fulfillment of the Shiʻi expectations for the Qá'im, but that he also was the beginning of a new prophetic dispensation.

=== Religious law ===
The Báb abrogated Islamic law and in the Persian Bayán promulgated a system of Bábí law, thus establishing a separate religion distinct from Islam. Some of the new laws included changing the direction of the Qibla to the Báb's house in Shiraz, Iran and changing the calendar to a solar calendar of nineteen months and nineteen days (which became the basis of the Baháʼí calendar) and prescribing the last month as a month of fasting. The Bab also prohibits confession and seeking forgiveness from anyone but God and His Manifestation.

In many respects, the Báb raised the status of women in his teachings. The Báb taught that, since God transcends the boundaries of male and female, God wishes that "neither men exalt themselves over women, nor women exalt themselves over men." He instructs his followers to not mistreat women "even for the blink of an eye" and sets the penalty for causing grief to women as double that of causing grief to men. (Persian Bayān 7:18) He also encourages the education of women and does not display a gender distinction in Bábi laws on education. Armin Eschraghi notes the context of 19th century Iran and that, "Modern western readers might not appreciate the revolutionary potential" of the Báb's teaching that "Those who have been brought up in this community, men and women, are allowed to look [at each other], speak and sit together." The Primal Will of God is also personified as the female figure of the Maid of Heaven. The Báb also foreshadowed later developments in media, by emphasising the need for a rapid system of news communication, which would be available for all to access, no matter their wealth or social standing. He writes, regarding the news, that "until such a system is made universal, its benefit will not reach those servants of the kingdom unless there come a time when it will be accessible to all the people. Although today the kings have their own special couriers, this is fruitless, for the poor are deprived of such a service." Commenting on the extremes of wealth and poverty in society, the Báb also teaches that the true station of the rich should be as "the depositories of God" and enjoins generosity and charity. He says, "Should ye find one stricken with poverty, enrich him to the extent of your ability ... should ye find one who is in distress, bring him tranquility by any means in your power."

Jack McLean, summarizing Baháʼí scholar Nader Saiedi's analysis, writes that "the Báb's writings even foresee current global issues of crisis, such as the protection of the environment and the commodification of natural resources." The Báb specifically calls for the absolute purity of water (Bayán 6:2). It may be easily deduced from this injunction that the environment must not be polluted since all substances return to the inland water table and the oceans. The Arabic Bayán (9:11) also forbids the commodification of the four elements, earth, air, fire and water.

The Báb also created a large number of other rituals, rites and laws. Some of these include the carrying of arms only in times of necessity, abstaining from smoking tobacco, the obligatory sitting on chairs, the advocating of the cleanliness displayed by Christians, the non-cruel treatment of animals, the prohibition of beating children severely, the recommendation of the printing of books, even scripture and the prohibition on the study of logic or dead languages, and abolishment of priesthood. Other laws include elaborate regulations regarding pilgrimage, fasting, the manufacture of rings, the use of perfume, and the washing and disposal of the dead.

Nader Saiedi states that the severe laws of the Bayán were never meant to be put in practice, because their implementation depended on the appearance of He whom God shall make manifest, while at the same time all of the laws would be abrogated unless the Promised One would reaffirm them. Saiedi concludes that these can then only have a strategic and symbolic meaning, and were meant to break through traditions and to focus the Báb's followers on obedience to He whom God shall make manifest.

== Writings ==
The Báb affirms that the verses revealed by a Manifestation of God are the greatest proof of His mission and the writings of the Báb comprise over two thousand tablets, epistles, prayers, and philosophical treatises. These writings form part of Baháʼí scripture, particularly his prayers, which are often recited individually as well as in devotional gatherings. The Báb's major writings include the Qayyúmu'l-Asmáʼ (a commentary on the Sura of Joseph), and the Persian Bayán, which the Bábís saw as superseding the Qurʼan. The latter has been translated into French; only portions exist in English.

The works of the Báb have also excited scholarly interest and analysis. Elham Afnan describes the writings of the Báb as having "restructured the thoughts of their readers, so that they could break free from the chains of obsolete beliefs and inherited customs". Jack McLean notes the novel symbolism of the Báb's works, observing that "The universe of the Báb's sacred writings is pervasively symbolic. Numbers, colors, minerals, liquids, the human body, social relationships, gestures, deeds, language (letters and words), and nature itself are all mirrors or signs that reflect the profounder reality of the names and attributes (asmá va sifát) of God". Todd Lawson similarly identifies in the commentaries of the Báb an assertion of "the potential and ultimate meaningfulness of all created things, from the highest to the lowest." The Báb's works are characterised by linguistic innovation, including many neologisms whenever He found existing theological terms inadequate. Several scholars have identified the continual repetition of particular words or phrases of religious importance to be a distinct feature throughout the Bab's writings. John Walbridge views the "unquestionably hypnotic" use of repetition in the Bab's Kitab-i-Panj Sha'n, where "the same evocative words are repeated ceaselessly" with gradual variations over time, as anticipating a minimalist aesthetic as well as possibly prefiguring the modernist style of Finnegans Wake. The Báb himself categorised his writings into five modes: divine verses, prayers, commentaries, rational discourse – written in Arabic – and the Persian mode, which encompasses the previous four. Baháʼí scholars have argued that there are commonalities between the Báb's writings and those of Western philosophers such as Hegel, Kant and James Joyce.

Most of the writings of the Báb have been lost. The Báb himself stated they exceeded five hundred thousand verses in length; the Qurʼan, in contrast, is 6300 verses in length. If one assumes 25 verses per page, that would equal 20,000 pages of text. Nabíl-i-Zarandí, in The Dawn-Breakers, mentions nine complete commentaries on the Qurʼan, revealed during the Báb's imprisonment at Máh-Kú, which have been lost without a trace. Establishing the true text of the works that are still extant, as already noted, is not always easy, and some texts will require considerable work. Others, however, are in good shape; several of the Báb's major works are available in the handwriting of his trusted secretaries.

Most works were revealed in response to specific questions by Bábís. This is not unusual; the genre of the letter has been a venerable medium for composing authoritative texts as far back as Paul of Tarsus. Three-quarters of the chapters of the New Testament are letters, were composed to imitate letters, or contain letters within them. Sometimes the Báb revealed works very rapidly by chanting them in the presence of a secretary and witnesses.

The Archives Department at the Baháʼí World Centre currently holds about 190 Tablets of the Báb. Excerpts from several principal works have been published in an English language compilation of the Báb's writings: Selections from the Writings of the Báb, other publications include Prayers from the Bab: The Remembrance of God. Denis MacEoin, in his Sources for Early Bābī Doctrine and History, gives a description of many works; much of the following summary is derived from that source. In addition to major works, the Báb revealed numerous letters to his wife and followers, many prayers for various purposes, numerous commentaries on verses or chapters of the Qurʼan, and many khutbihs or sermons (most of which were never delivered). Many of these have been lost; others have survived in compilations.

Also significant to Bábism are the writings of Quddús, which "display a close similarity to that of the Báb in both form and content" according to Moojan Momen and Todd Lawson, as well as the poetry and prose of Tahirih.

== See also ==
- New religious movement
- Outline of Bábism
- Selections from the Writings of the Báb
- Hooshmand Dehghan
