= Central Organization for Durable Peace =

International organization, disestablished after the Treaty of Versailles

The Central Organization for a Durable Peace was established at The Hague, The Netherlands, in April 1915. Its members were individuals from ten European states, Germany, Belgium, England, Austria-Hungary, Italy, Holland, Norway, Sweden, Denmark, Switzerland, and the United States. They called for a "new diplomacy", willing to accept military sanctions against aggressive countries.

The Organization was dissolved after the Treaty of Versailles. Involved American peace leaders included Fannie Fern Andrews, Emily Greene Balch and William Isaac Hull.

== See also ==
- Peace Palace
- Tablet to The Hague, a 1919 letter to the organization from ʻAbdu'l-Bahá, the head of the Baháʼí Faith
