= Quddús =

One of the Letters of the Living of Bábism

Jináb-i-Quddús (Arabic: قدوس) (c.1820–1849), is the title of Mullá Muḥammad ʻAlí-i-Bárfurúshi, who was the most prominent disciple of the Báb. He was the eighteenth and final Letter of the Living.

== Biography ==
=== Early life and education ===
Quddús was born in Bárfurúsh (modern-day Babol), a city in Mazandaran Province near the Caspian Sea. At the time, Bárfurúsh had a population of approximately fifty thousand and was considered the largest city in Mazandaran. Quddús was born in a neighborhood named Chaharshanbeh-pish. His father's house was located near the eastern bank of the Áq-rúd River. Different sources offer slightly different years for his birth, between 1815 and 1822. Nabíl-i-Zarandí's hagiographic history The Dawn-Breakers states that he was born in 1822, and this date is often reproduced by Bahá'í sources, while Abbas Amanat concludes that 1819 is the most likely date, based on the evidence of Quddús' own writings and statements made by other primary sources about his age at the time of his death in 1849. However, in the book Ganj-i-Penhan (The Life and Works of Quddús), Hooshmand Dehghan determines the year 1822 based on various historical evidences.

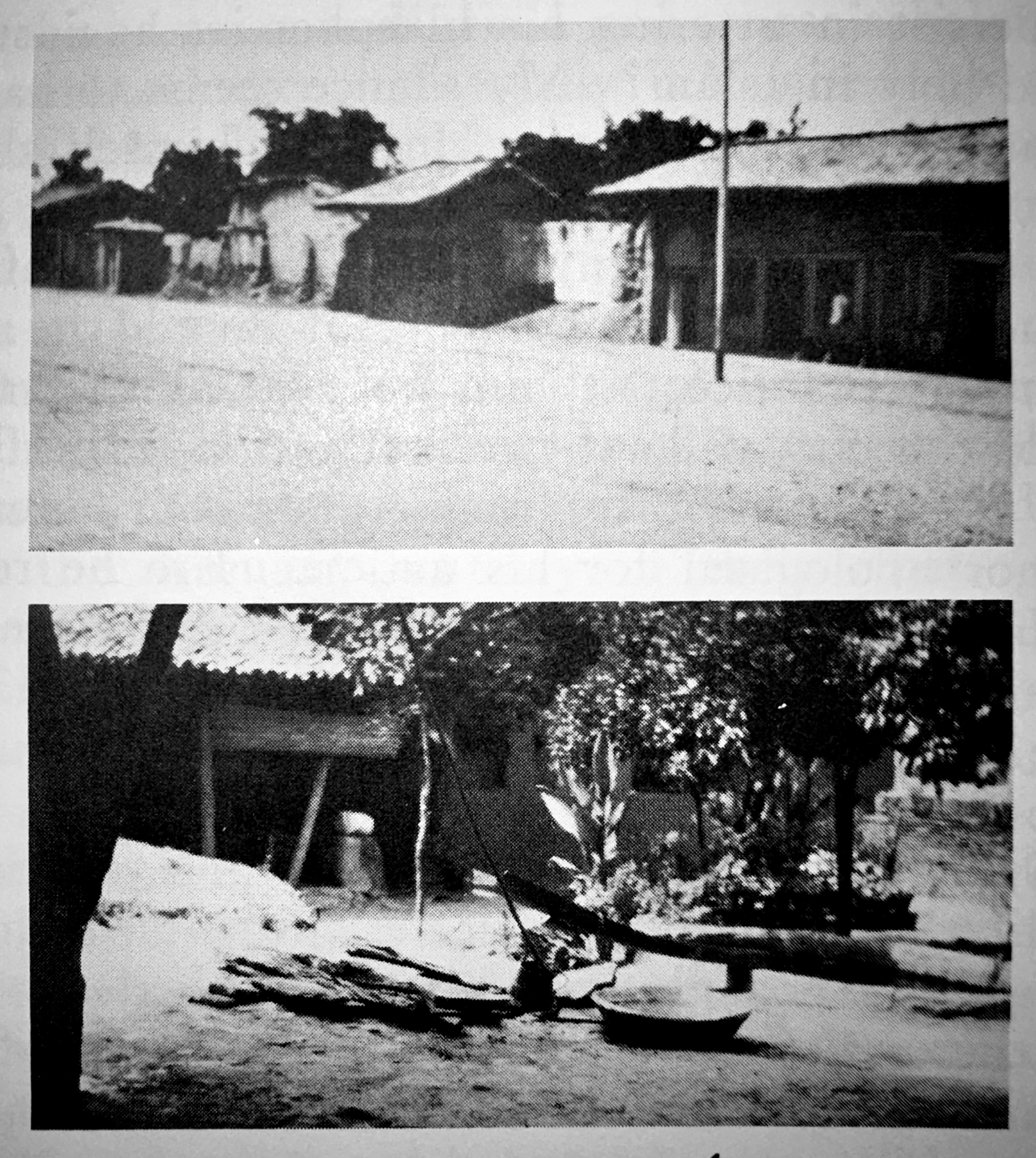
Two views of the house of Quddús' father in Babol.

His father, Áqá Muḥammad-Ṣáliḥ, was a small-scale, illiterate rice farmer. However, Dehqan notes that he was a broad bean farmer; as 'bakele' is the Mazandarani word for broad bean, he was known among the locals of Bárfurúsh as Áqá Muḥammad-Ṣáliḥ Bakele-kar. His mother—whose name is not recorded—was a descendant of Muhammad through his grandson Hasan, the second Imam of Shia Islam. His mother died when Quddús was still an infant. His father later remarried, and Quddús had a close relationship with his stepmother and his half-brothers by her. Neither his father or stepmother ever converted to Bábism or the Bahá'í Faith, but they received negative attention from local leaders because of their children's religious activities, and his stepmother developed close relationships with Baha'is in Qaem Shahr towards the end of her life. Quddús had two half-brothers—Mírzá Haydar and Áqá Muḥammad-Ṣádiq and a sister—Maryam. All of his siblings converted to Bábism, and at least Muhammad-Sádiq later became a Bahá'í. His parents and Muhammad-Sádiq outlived him, while Haydar was executed during the battle of Shaykh Tabarsi, and Maryam died shortly after Quddús and Haydar.

During his lifetime, Babol was one of many Iranian cities where the resident of neighborhoods and villages were segregated according to each households allegiance to one of two moieties, known as the Haydarís and Ne'matis. Quddus' household and relatives were aligned with the Ne'mati faction. While the divide between Ne'matis and Haydarís was not fundamentally a religious divide, many Ne'mati's in Babol at the time were adherents of the nascent Shia school of Shaykhism, while the Haydarís largely remained aligned with the dominant Usuli school. The family of Quddús were supporters of the local Shayki cleric Mullá Muhammad-Hamza Sharíʻat-madár, who employed Quddús as an attendant in his youth and likely arranged for him to receive a basic education from other members of the cleric's retinue.

=== Clerical education ===
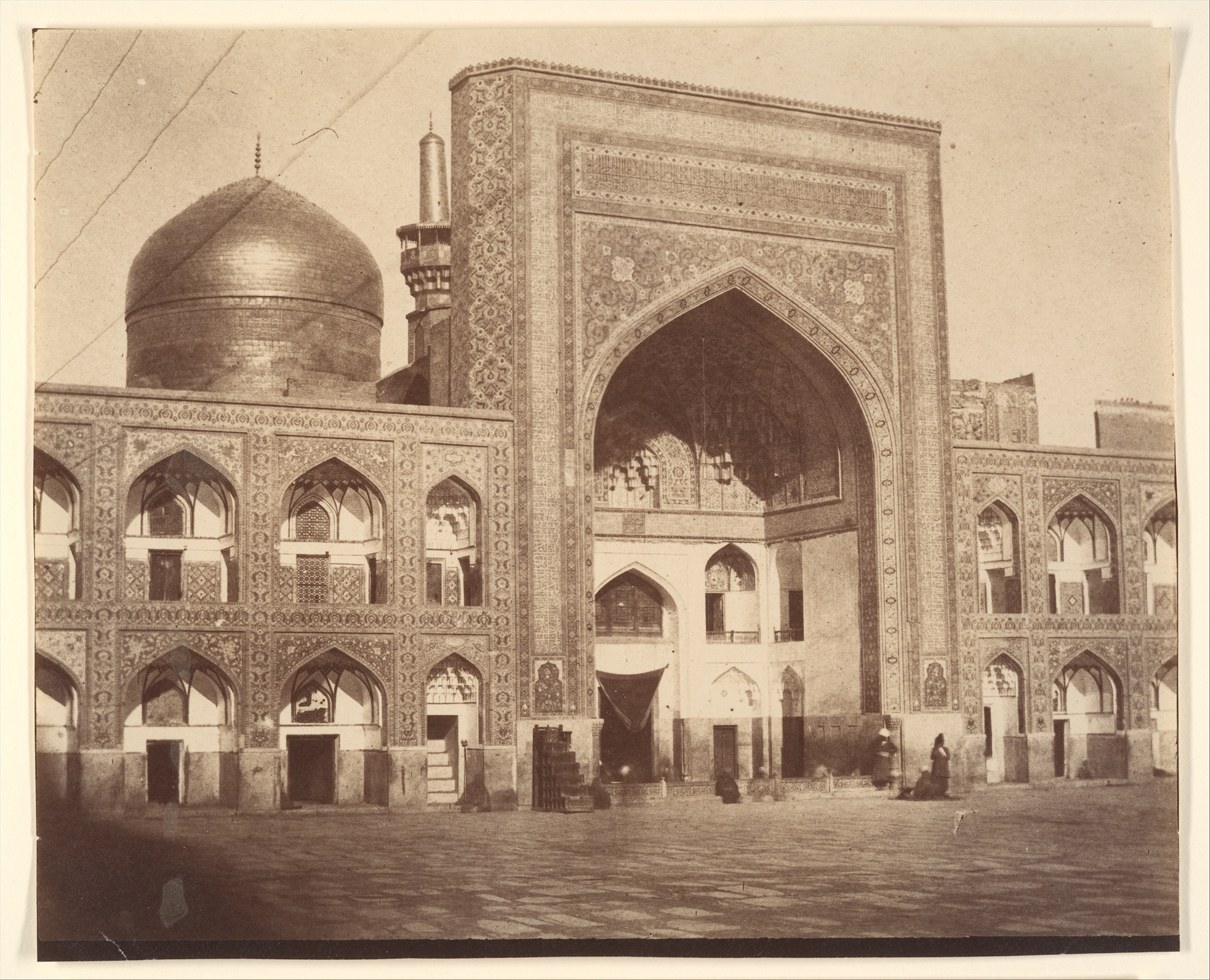
Main Gate of the Imam Reza shrine complex in Mashhad, circa 1850, which housed the seminary of Mírzá Ja'far during Quddús' studies.

After receiving a basic education in the house of Sharíʻat-madár, Quddús was sent to the town of Sárí for a madrassa education. After a few years in Sárí, he was sent to another madrassa in Mashad, where he became a member of a small group of Shaykhi students which included Mullá Husayn and a number of other future Bábís.

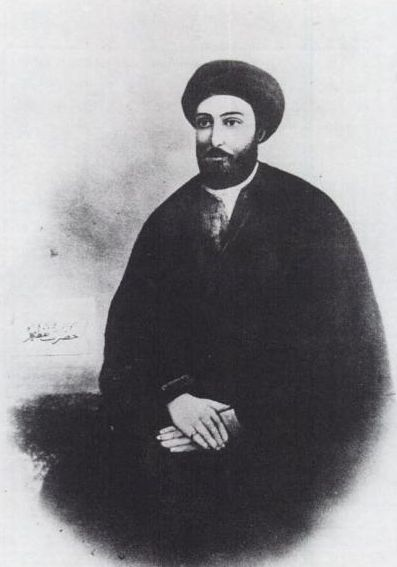
Quddús's teacher, Siyyid Kazim Rashti.

When he was eighteen, Quddús left for the Shia holy city of Karbala in Iraq, where he spent four years studying under Sayyid Kázim, then the leader of the Shaykhi denomination. While living in Iraq he out religious retreats at the shrine of the ʻAtabát, and developed a particular devotion to the Imams. He returned to Bárfurúsh in March 1844, now a fully trained and licensed mullá—a Shia legal scholar endorsed by a teacher, and able to issue judgements on matters of religious law.

Babol was disrupted by a conflict between Quddús childhood patron Sharī'atmadār and a cleric named Mulla Sa'id Bárfurúshi. Mullá Saʻíd-i-Bárfurúshí was called Sa'id al-ʻUlamá. Sharī'atmadār represented the Niʻmatí kinship group and the Shaykhi religious faction. The Sa'id al-ʻUlamá represented the Haydarís and the Usuli school. Sharī'atmadār and Quddús were supported by large numbers of residents in Niʻmatís areas. Quddús was described as charismatic and meticulously observant of religious rituals. The supporters of Sharī'atmadār and Quddús were largely peasants, while the Sa'id al-ʻUlamá had a wealthier set of supporters.

He was described as a charismatic mullá (religious leader) with "affability, combined with dignity and bearing" and he became a notable person within his hometown. Mírzá Músá, who met him in 1846, said: "whoever was intimately associated with him was seized with an insatiable admiration for the charm of the youth".

=== Conversion to Bábism ===
In 1844, He met the Báb in Shiraz, and recognized him as the revelatory figure that he and other Shayki had been seeking after the death of Sayyid Kazim. Although there is some disagreement among early primary sources and later analysts as to the exact identity of the first nineteen converts to Bábism and the order in which they recognized Sayyid ʿAlí Muḥammad, there is widespread agreement that Mullá Muḥammad ʻAlí was the last member of the group to arrive and accept the Báb's prophetic claims. He arrived in Shiraz independently from any other group of Shayki seekers after traveling from Babol; he may have been passing through Shiraz on his way to complete an Islamic pilgrimage to Mecca, or may have heard about the Báb's declaration from a Shayki contact and set out to Shiraz with the intent of investigating the matter.

The Báb gave the first nineteen converts to Bábism the title of the Letters of the Living, and entrusted them with tasks that would fulfill important prophecies from Shia eschatology. He directed each of them to travel to a different area of Persia or Iraq to evangelize on his behalf, to expand the number of followers of the new religion, attract the support of prominent civil and religious leaders, and gather a base of support in the cities of the ʻAtabát—the Shia shrines of Iraq. Mullá Husayn was sent to Isfahan, Tehran, and Khorasan and given responsibility for announcing the message of the Bab to the Shah. Mullá 'Alí and others were sent to Karbalá and the other shrine cities of Iraq. Quddús was selected to accompany the Báb on pilgrimage to Mecca, where they would announce the start of a new revelation in the holiest city in the Muslim world.

=== Accompanying the Báb on pilgrimage ===
After the eighteen Letters of the Living recognized him, the Báb and Quddús left on a pilgrimage to Mecca and Medina, the sacred cities of Islam. The Báb's household slave Mubárak is the only other person who is generally agreed to have travelled with the party. Quddús was chosen to accompany the Báb primarily due to the closeness of their relationship, and served as the Báb's amanuensis during the journey.

The pilgrims left Shiraz on September 10, 1844, departing from the port of Bushehr on the 19th of Ramadán (October, 1844), and arriving in Mecca on the first of Dhi'l-Hájjih (December 12, 1844). The journey by sea lasted a total of seventy days, and—owing to humid weather, rough seas, and unpleasant interactions with fellow pilgrims— was very difficult. The party experienced discrimination and abuse from other pilgrims as a result of ethnic and sectarian prejudice, and the Báb later described the majority of the pilgrims as "a bunch of useless and ignorant people" who violated traditions of pious behavior expected of pilgrims.

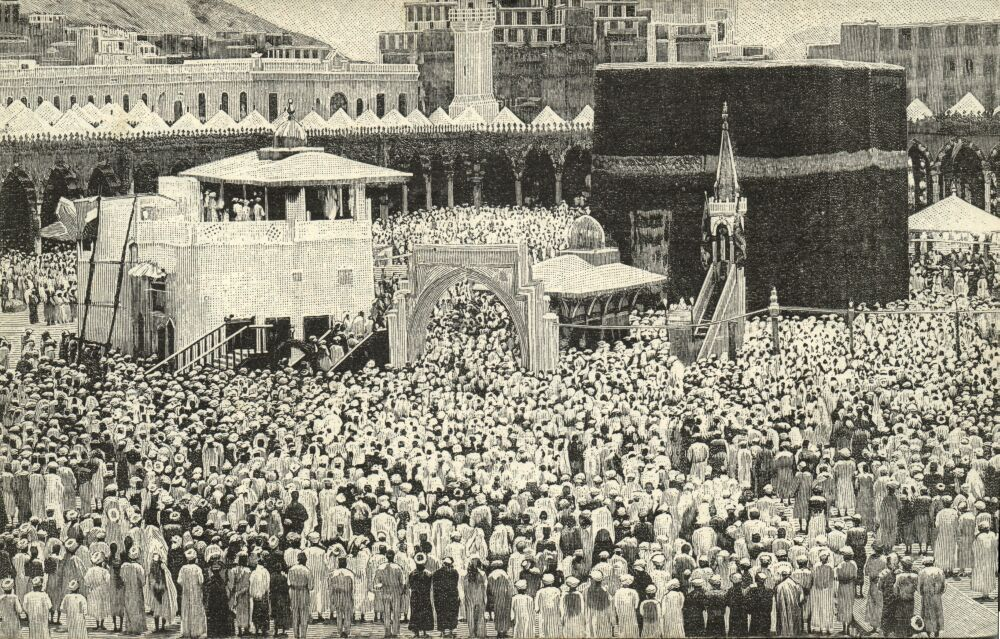
The Kaaba in Mecca during the 1886 Hajj

In Mecca, the Báb, Mubárak, and Quddús performed the expected rituals of the Hajj. On the day of Eid al Adha, the Báb sacrificed nineteen lambs, "nine in his own name, seven in the name of Quddús, and three in the name of his Ethiopian servant [Mubárak]". During this pilgrimage the Báb publicly claimed to be the Qa'im, meeting with a number of prominent religious figures in an attempt to gain their allegiance. Quddús was tasked with delivering a letter of the Báb to the Sharif of Mecca—the Custodian of the Kaaba—proclaiming his status. Portions of this letter are included in the book Selections from the Writings of the Báb. Although the Báb had initially planned to travel to the shrine cities of Iraq after his pilgrimage, he received a letter in early 1845 describing the difficulties that Mullá ʻAlíy-i-Bastami (the second Letter of the Living) had encountered in that region and decided that he and his party should instead return to the port of Bushehr. The Báb's decision not to gather his growing community of followers in Karbalá was disappointing to many who had expected him to lead a military revolution against the forces of orthodoxy, fulfilling the role of the Mahdi.

The Báb's, Mubárak and Quddús returned to Bushehr in the spring of 1845. While the Báb engaged in correspondence with Persian government ministers seeking to gain Mullá ʻAlíy-i-Bastami freedom from imprisonment in Ottoman territory, he ordered Quddús to travel to Shiraz on a mission of evangelism. Zarandí records the Báb as having indicated to Quddús that the two of them would never meet again after parting in Bushehr:

"Yours will be the ineffable joy of quaffing the cup of martyrdom for His sake. I, too, shall tread the path of sacrifice, and will join you in the realm of eternity."

=== Persecution in Shiraz ===
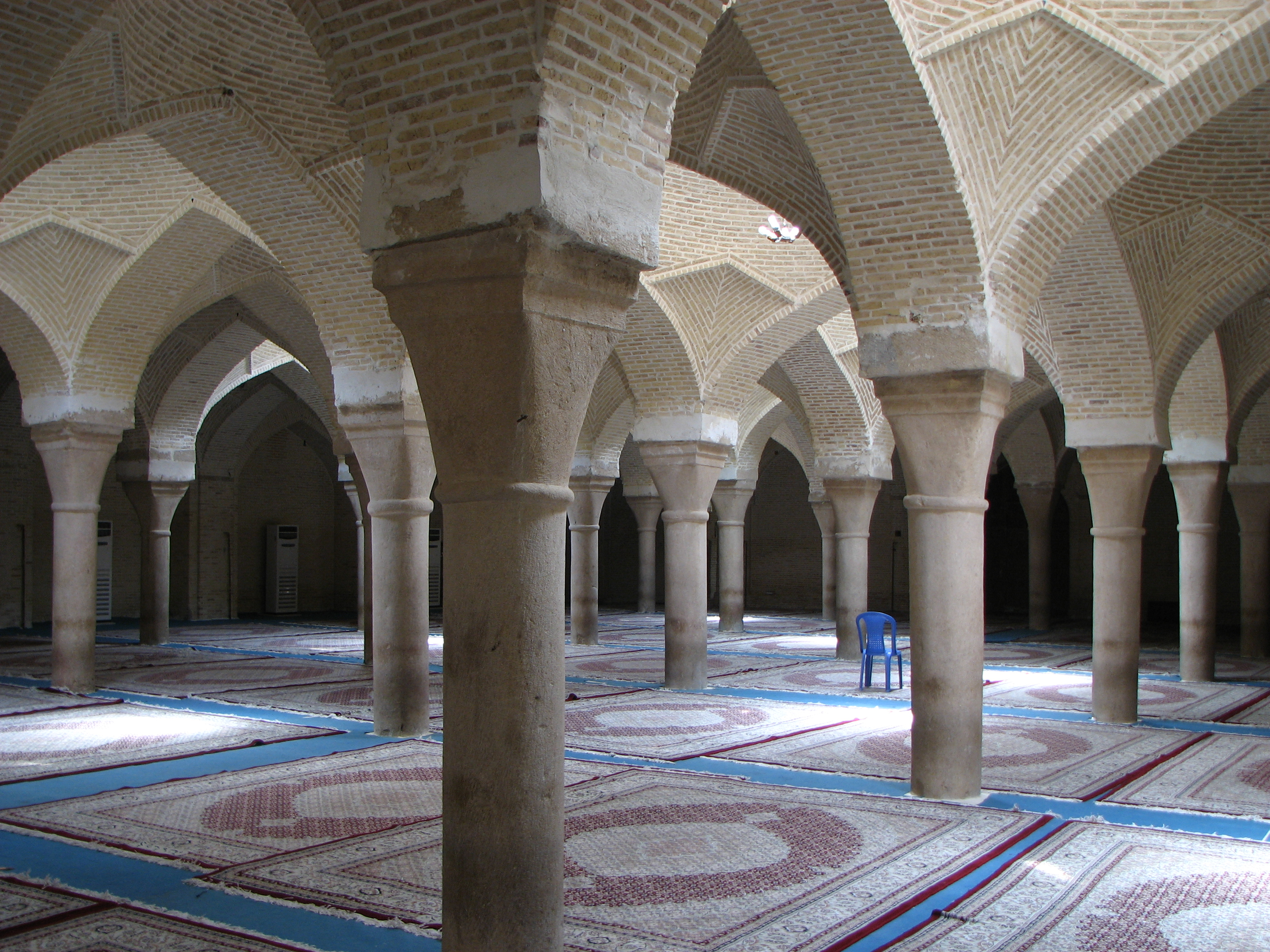
The interior of the Masjid-i-Naw in Shiraz, where both Mullá Sadiq and Quddús made public declarations of belief in the Báb's prophetic mission.

Before Quddús arrived in Shiraz, a small number of other Bábís had already begun to engage in evangelical activity in the city including the provocative action of appending a statement about the Báb's to a call to prayer proclaimed from the minaret of a prominent mosque. After his arrival, Quddús ascended the same minaret and read from the Báb's Qayyūm al-asmā. Another Bábí, Mulla Sadiq Khurasani—known as Muqaddas among Bábís and Bahá'ís—made public declarations that "the Gate to the Hidden Imam had appeared". Prior to Quddús's mission in Shiraz the Letters of the Living had largely kept the identity of the Báb secret, but during these public declarations they openly connected their movement with Siyyid ʿAlí-Muḥammad of Shiraz for the first time. In response to these actions, the governor of the city ordered Quddús, Muqaddas, and another Bábí arrested and tried by a religious council.

As a result of the trial Quddús experienced his first persecution as a Bábí. The governor ordered Muqaddas to be whipped, and all three Bábís had their beards burned, then their noses pierced, and threaded with halters; "then, having been led through the streets in this disgraceful condition, they were expelled from the city." The brutal treatment of the Bábís became a matter of international news, covered by newspapers in the UK starting November 1, 1845, followed by the US, Australia, and New Zealand. Quddús's travel to Shiraz brought the Báb's claim to the attention of the governor, Husayn Khan, who ordered the Báb arrested en route to Shiraz in summoned the Báb to Shiraz in July 1845.

=== Travels ===
Following his expulsion from Shiraz, Quddús travelled across Persia teaching of the new religion, travelling through Yazd, Kermanshah, Isfahan, and Tehran before returning to Babol. When Quddús returned to Babol after his pilgrimage, he retained some popularity from his time there in 1843, and stories of his travels had reached his hometown, inflating his prominence in local discourse. Quddús now took a more prominent role in the rivalry between Shari'atmadar and the Sa'id al-ʻUlamá, openly criticizing the corruption of the clerical class, and advancing messianic theology, but not yet promoting Bábism or revealing the identity of the Báb. Quddus and the Sai'd al-ʻUlamá exchanged a series of letters, debating theology and the role of the ʻUlamá. Quddús criticized the practice of taqlid, and promoted the idea of intuitive knowledge as a source of religious teaching, in line with Shaykhi doctrines and setting the stage for the announcement of the Báb as a new sources of revelation that would transcend the rigid rules developed through centuries of jurisprudence. In response to Quddús' growing popularity, the Sa'id al-ʻUlamá and other Usuli leaders organized for him and his followers to be harassed by lutis, teamsters who also acted as gangs of street toughs in the ongoing contest between the Niʻmatís and Haydarís.

=== Conference of Badasht ===
Along with Tahirih and Baha'u'llah, Quddús was one of three major figures in the Conference of Badasht (June–July 1848), where prominent Bábís gathered to clarify matters of doctrine and determine the next steps to be taken by the growing community in the face of increasing persecution at the hands of Persia's clerical and civil leadership. One of the most important Bábí leaders and regarded by his contemporaries as the exponent of the less radical, more conservative element within the Bábí movement, Quddús ostensibly distanced himself from Tahirih's radicalism and break from Islam. However, this was in fact part of what Shoghi Effendi described as "a pre-conceived plan designed to mitigate the alarm and consternation which such a conference was sure to arouse" and, to the dismay of some Bábís and the appreciation of others, Quddús wholeheartedly embraced Tahirih's radicalism and the two departed Badasht together on the same camel.

=== Battle of Fort Tabarsi ===
From October 10, 1848 to May 10, 1849, the first major military confrontation took place between the Bábís and the local military, instigated by the Islamic clergy. A group of over 200 Bábís were initially attacked by mobs in Bárfurúsh, and fled to the nearby shrine of Shaykh Tabarsi, where they built a defensive fort and received escalating attacks, initially local raids, but later organized imperial regiments. Although the initial clash involved Mullá Husayn, Quddús became the commander of the Bábís upon his arrival at the fort on October 20, 1848.

Over the months that followed, Baháʼí sources assert that a number of miraculous events occurred in which a small band of untrained soldiers bore the full brunt of government regiments several times their size, always coming out victorious (see God Passes By, chapter III; and The Dawn-Breakers, chapter XIX). During the last month of the siege, the Bábís went without food or water, and survived by consuming shoe leather and ground bones. The battle became an embarrassment to the Persian authorities, and it was ended by the Prince Mihdí-Qulí Mírzá, who sent Quddús a copy of the Qurʼan. On the opening Surah he wrote:

"I swear by this most holy Book, by the righteousness of God who has revealed it, and the Mission of Him who was inspired with its verses, that I cherish no other purpose than to promote peace and friendliness between us. Come forth from your stronghold and rest assured that no hand will be stretched forth against you. You yourself and your companions, I solemnly declare, are under the sheltering protection of the Almighty, of Muhammad, His Prophet, and of Násiriʼd-Dín Sháh, our sovereign. I pledge my honour that no man, either in this army or in this neighbourhood, will ever attempt to assail you. The malediction of God, the omnipotent Avenger, rest upon me if in my heart I cherish any other desire than that which I have stated."

(The Dawn-Breakers, pg 399)

After leaving the fort, they were gathered in a tent and disarmed, and some taken away as prisoners. The army plundered and destroyed the fort, and then opened fire on the Bábís, killing them all.

=== Death ===
Quddús himself was escorted by the prince to Bárfurúsh, where the local population was celebrating. The prince's plan was to take his prisoner to Tehran and give him to the Shah. However, the Saʼídu'l-ʻUlamá of Bárfurúsh vowed to deny himself food and sleep until such a time as he could kill Quddús with his own hands. The prince arranged a meeting with Quddús and the ʻUlamá, and afterwards handed his prisoner over to them. On 16 May 1849, Quddús was handed over to an angry mob. Nabil records: "By the testimony of Baháʼu'lláh, that heroic youth, who was still on the threshold of his life, was subjected to such tortures and suffered such a death as even Jesus had not faced in the hour of His greatest agony." His body was torn apart and its pieces thrown into a fire. What was left of him were gathered by a friend and interred in a nearby place (see the Taríkh-i-Jadíd, p. 92).

At the time, the Báb was imprisoned in Chihríq and was so grieved that he stopped writing or dictating for a period of six months. About two years after the battle of Fort Tabarsi, Abbás-Qulí Khán (the sieging general) was heard describing the battle to a prince, comparing it to the Battle of Karbala, and himself to Shimr Ibn Thil-Jawshan, who slew Imam Husayn.

== Legacy and religious significance ==
=== Writings ===
Quddús identified himself with Jesus in his writings, and the Bábis associated him with prophecies regarding the role of Christ in Islamic eschatology. During his youth in Babol, Quddús was rumoured to have been born out of wedlock, and may have emphasized an identification with Christ as a defense against these rumours.

Many of his writings focus on the corruption of the ʻUlamá and their outdated nature in the time following the Báb's revelation. His writings make clear that his many thwarted attempts to engage the clerics in debate, the general dismissal of the Bábí movement by prominent theologians, the role of the mullas in whipping up violent opposition to the Bábís, and the extreme persecution and physical violence he himself had endured since 1844, had left him bitter and fiercely opposed to the entire class. Years of persecution led him to believe that violent self-defense was the only way that Bábís would be able to avoid being forced to recant, and by 1848 his writings include support for such action.

According to Moojan Momen and Todd Lawson, the writings of Quddús, "display a close similarity to that of the Báb in both form and content".

=== Bahá'í view ===
"Regarding the station of Quddus, he should by no means be considered having had the station of a Prophet. His station was no doubt a very exalted one, and far above that of any of the Letters of the Living, including the first Letter, Mulla Husayn. Quddus reflected more than any of the disciples of the Bab the light of His teaching."

(11 November 1936, written on behalf of Shoghi Effendi to an individual believer).

"It may be helpful to consider that in the Dispensation of the Bab, Quddus is referred to as the "Last Point", and the "Last Name of God", is identified, as pointed out in God Passes By, with one of the "Messengers charged with imposture" mentioned in the Qurʼan, and is one of the "two witnesses" into whom "the spirit of life from God" must enter, as attested by 'Abdu'l-Baha in Some Answered Questions, yet, despite these sublime stations, he is not regarded as an independent Manifestation of God."

(24 August 1975, written on behalf of the Universal House of Justice to an individual believer).

== See also ==
- Hooshmand Dehghan
