= Baháʼí Faith in South Carolina =

Baháʼí Faith in American state

The Baháʼí Faith in South Carolina begins in the transition from Jim Crow to the Civil Rights Movement but defines another approach to the problem and proceeds according to its teachings. The first mention in relation to the history of the religion came in the 1860s in a newspaper article. Following this, the first individual from South Carolina to find the religion was Louis Gregory in 1909, followed by individuals inside the state. Communities of Baháʼís were soon operating in North Augusta, Columbia and Greenville and struggled with segregation culture through the 1950s, both externally and internally. However, in the 1969-1973 period, a very remarkable and somewhat unsustainable period of conversions to the religion on the basis of a meeting of Christian and Baháʼí religious ideas established a basis of community across several counties - notably Marion, Williamsburg, and Dillon, served by the Louis Gregory Institute and its radio station WLGI, but also across the wider area. That community continues and has gathered news coverage as part of the second-largest religion in South Carolina.

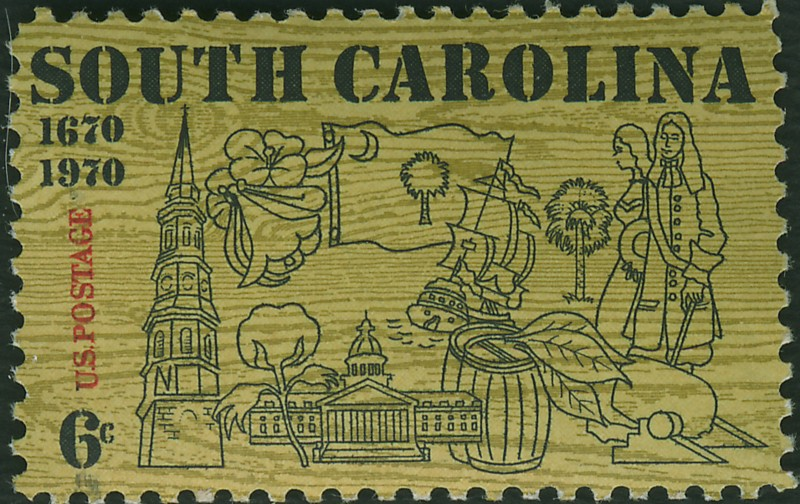
1970 - a pivotal year for the Baháʼís in South Carolina too

== Early history ==
=== Firsts ===
The first connections of South Carolina with the Baháʼí Faith occur in the presence of the first Baháʼí to join the religion in the West, with his service in the American Civil War in South Carolina 30 years before he would join the religion, followed by re-publication of the first paper to mention events related to the history of the Baháʼí Faith.

==== 1864-5 ====
After seeking out training to be an officer in black infantry units, by May, 1864, Thornton Chase, later recognized as the first occidental Baháʼí, was second in charge of one hundred men, Company K of the 26th Regiment Infantry U.S. Colored Troops which fought two battles south of Charleston, S.C. and was wounded. He then sought out a second opportunity to serve and in 1865 was promoted to captain and commanded Company D of the 104th United States Colored Infantry. That unit was organized at Beaufort, S. C., April–June, 1865, and did guard duty at various points in South Carolina till February, 1866. Chase's resignation was accepted November 7, 1865, in Beaufort, S. C. He would join the religion 30 years later. Louis Gregory's future stepfather, George Gregory, was First Sergeant in Company C of the 104th in 1866.

The first mention related to the history of the religion known in South Carolina was in a newspaper article. It was published in June 1865 in The Daily Phoenix of Columbia, South Carolina, on the front page, reviewing events that occurred from 1844 to 1850 or so. The source of the extended quote is not named and makes mistakes typical of the period. See also Josephus on Jesus. It was originally presented in an article in The Literary World of June 14, 1851, as a letter dated February 10, 1851, by Dr. Rev. Austin H. Wright to the American Oriental Society. It was subsequently also published in a newspaper on June 26, 1851, and was published in a German newspaper in 1851 and translated by his superior, Rev. Justin Perkins. Wright, father of Lucy Myers Wright Mitchell and John Henry Wright, was a medical missionary from New England, and gained his medical degree in Virginia. Wright was the first person to write a paper giving an account of Bábism, and died in what was then called Urumiah, Persia, January 14, 1865. The Daily Phoenix itself began publication in March 1865 after Sherman's March to the Sea burned a third of the city or more and by April was being published as a daily paper.

==== Louis George Gregory ====
Louis George Gregory was the first person from South Carolina to join the Baháʼí Faith. He was born on June 6, 1874, in Charleston, South Carolina, to African-American parents liberated during the Civil War including his birth father that died when Gregory was very young - Ebenezer (E. F.) George, who died before 1880. In 1881, his mother married George Gregory. During his elementary schooling, Gregory attended the first public school that was open to both African Americans and Whites in Charleston and then the Avery Institute, the leading school for Americans of African descent in Charleston, and gave the graduation speech entitled, "Thou Shalt Not Live For Thyself Alone." Gregory attended Fisk University, Howard University, and was admitted to the bar in Washington, D.C., in 1902. In 1906, Gregory started to work in the United States Department of the Treasury, and continued to rise in society in various forms of service to the community and the profession. Meanwhile, Gregory was visible in the newspapers over racist incidents.

While at the Treasury Department, Gregory heard of the Baháʼí Faith and attended a lecture by Lua Getsinger, a leading Baháʼí, in 1907. In that meeting, he met Pauline Hannen, raised in Wilmington, North Carolina, and her husband, and they invited him to many other meetings. Gregory was much affected by the behavior of the Hannens and the religion after having become disillusioned with Christianity.

Unbeknownst to Gregory, the next known newspaper article mentioning the early days of the religion in South Carolina was in 1909, when The Manning Times printed a somewhat inaccurate article on the Báb. 1909 was also a year of changes for Gregory - he joined the Baháʼí Faith, received a personal letter from ʻAbdu'l-Bahá, then head of the religion, was elected president of the Bethel Literary and Historical Society, left the Treasury Department and established his practice in Washington, D.C.

On July 23, 1909, Gregory wrote to the Hannens that he was an adherent of the Baháʼí Faith:

It comes to me that I have never taken occasion to thank you specifically for all your kindness and patience, which finally culminated in my acceptance of the great truths of the Baháʼí Revelation. It has given me an entirely new conception of Christianity and of all religion, and with it my whole nature seems changed for the better...It is a sane and practical religion, which meets all the varying needs of life, and I hope I shall ever regard it as a priceless possession.

The letter from ʻAbdu'l-Bahá said in part:

I hope that thou mayest become… the means whereby the white and colored people shall close their eyes to racial differences and behold the reality of humanity, that is the universal truth which is the oneness of the kingdom of the human race…. Rely as much as thou canst on the True One, and be thou resigned to the Will of God, so that like unto a candle thou mayest be enkindled in the world of humanity and like unto a star thou mayest shine and gleam from the Horizon of Reality and become the cause of the guidance of both races.

In 1910, Gregory stopped working as a lawyer and began a lifelong service to the religion, largely by holding meetings and traveling for the religion, and wrote and lectured on the subject of racial unity and the religion. That year Gregory initiated a major trip through the South to promulgate the religion. He travelled to Richmond, Virginia, Durham, North Carolina, Charleston, South Carolina, the city of his family and childhood, and Macon, Georgia. After this first trip Gregory went on pilgrimage and was elected to positions in the religion and worked on concerns in race-integration in Washington, D.C., which were settled with ʻAbdu'l-Bahá's visit, and his marriage - Gregory eventually returned to traveling to promote the religion but his endeavors were national in scope against a backdrop of societal challenges like Lynching in the United States and Jim Crow laws.

==== Alonzo Twine ====
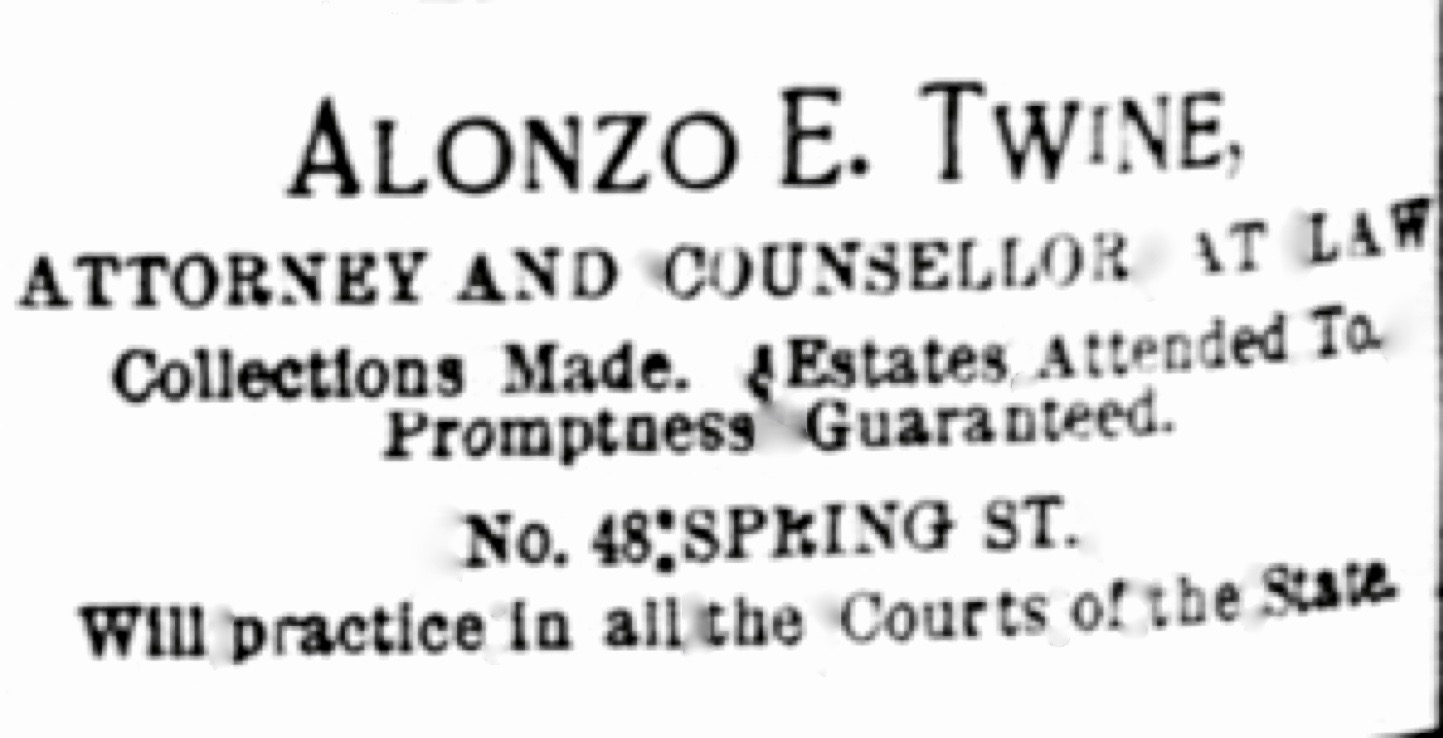
Advertisement for Alonzo E. Twine, Attorney at law (no picture known for him)

Where Gregory had gone on to be a lawyer in 1902 in the relative North, African-American Alonzo E. Twine became a practicing lawyer registered with the South Carolina Supreme Court by 1897 and argued cases into 1910. This did not prevent him from being beaten publicly by another lawyer in 1903. His father was a freeborn carpenter and Union Army veteran, his mother a domestic servant. This was during the Tillman era and disfranchisement, 1890–1914.

Gregory spoke at a number of engagements in Charleston in 1910 and encountered a minister who had been to Green Acre and heard of the religion. Gregory also addressed the group of local Black lawyers. Twine, a trustee of the Old Bethel United Methodist Church, was the first to identify himself as a Baháʼí in South Carolina. Gregory wrote to the Hannens of it, "…[Twine] was particularly impressed with the explanation concerning 'clouds.' He added that if Christ were to come through the literal clouds, he certainly would be hidden from half the earth, in view of its roundness." Gregory left and would be away for a number of years. In the meantime, unbeknownst to Gregory, a year later Twine was committed to a mental institution by his mother and family priest, Rev. I. E. Lowery, for "religious obsession," though he hadn't lost any work and wasn't a threat to himself or others but was judged a threat to society. He died three years later, October 26, 1914.

Lowery was still using his knowledge of the fate of Twine to warn those interested in hearing Gregory's message a few years later.

=== Sporadic to Sustained community ===
Earliest Baháʼís in South Carolina

A significant starting point in the growth of a stable presence of the religion was around 1911, when Margaret Klebs, from Prussia, after joining the religion, settled in Augusta, Georgia. She learned of the religion at Green Acre c. 1901 and was living and working in the Augusta-North Augusta-Aiken area by 1911. She also met ʻAbdu'l-Bahá when he visited the US in 1912, including a private interview directing her to return to the South and promote the religion. By the winter of 1912-13, she was back in the Augusta-North Augusta-Aiken area. In March 1912 and May 1913, she arranged for music programs. Society editor Julia Moore of the Augusta Herald became friends with Klebs and a student of the religion and publicized events - and various students of Klebs also investigated the religion and several enrolled. In 1914, Klebs invited Joseph Hannen for a series of talks - James U. Jackson's mansion, at the African-American Schofield Normal and Industrial School, and there was a concert again at the Hampton Terrace Hotel. Klebs and the small group of Baháʼís managed to have several stories in the local paper in 1915 and 1917. At the time, there was a brief mention of a Baháʼí presence at the Panama-Pacific Exposition in 1915.

By 1918, the community included six individuals - G. P. Talbot, Louise Biggar Talbot, Ann McKennie Verdery, Myrtis Tinsley, Julia Moore, Robert Irvin - though two had moved to Savannah, Georgia, and another was added in 1920 - Esther Sego. Louise was the community delegate to the 1919 nations convention. Baháʼí speakers continued to be invited and in 1920, Assadu'llah Mazindarani - a designated scholar sent by ʻAbdu'l-Bahá - addressed a colored audience of some 65 men who left with "tears in their eyes."

Newspapers from the 1920s to the 1940s made a variety of minor mentions of the religion.

==== Tablets of the Divine Plan ====
Though interrupted by World War I, in 1916–1919 the Tablets of the Divine Plan were written by ʻAbdu'l-Bahá and released in stages - calling for attention in various areas, including a delineation of "the southern states," noting "… you must either go yourselves or send a number of blessed souls to those states, so that they may guide the people to the kingdom of heaven." Joseph Hannen, Gregory, and two others set their focus on the South starting in 1916.

This was during a period of both strong White power structures, the first organizations of the NAACP in South Carolina, and spreading violence and intimidation, the "resurgent" Ku Klux Klan and moderate YMCA and YWCA organizations that kept an "absolute loyalty to the principle of racial integrity." Gregory made a trip through South Carolina from Wilmington, NC, in early 1919 before the April annual Baháʼí convention and during it the previous Tablets and some new ones were officially unveiled. The new ones included the quote "unquestionably the divine teachings must reveal themselves with a brighter effulgence… and the fragrances of holiness be diffused with swiftness and rapidity" comparing the situation with Gregory the Illuminator facing the Armenia of long ago but setting the context in seeking freeing the people from racial prejudice - a line of action he foresaw would have "a transforming impact on the United States and the world". The Baháʼís established a national committee to begin overseeing the work and Hannen coordinated the orientation to the South - following which Gregory made a circuit of trips in the winter of 1920 and 1921 between South Carolina and Georgia with the help of Roy Williams, who also spoke at Black colleges Benedict College and Allen University. A Baháʼí's home was firebombed, two were jailed and Persian Baháʼí Dr Zia Bagdadi aided relief efforts. Another time, Gregory and Harlan Ober discussed having "mass meetings" to alleviate racial tension. In 1921, Gregory focused with Agnes Parsons on a national campaign of hosting Race Amity Conventions. Around and between instances of meetings, Gregory spoke at several churches in Columbia and connected with Josiah Morse at the University of South Carolina there, who then welcomed Baháʼís on a number of occasions into the 1930s. Gregory often used the example of Samuel Chiles Mitchell, a past president of the University of South Carolina who had met ʻAbdu'l-Bahá.

Gregory's talk in 1921 in Columbia at Sidney Park Colored Methodist Episcopal Church inspired a full-column response by Lowery, which was echoed in a number of newspapers with statewide reach. In a situation of a society with widespread methods of White supremacy over BlacksLowery was a voice of accommodation, though he had joined the northern Methodists against his former owner's Southern branch, pointing out the "…'best white people' and the newspapers were opposed" to the riots and lynchings undertaken against the Blacks because of rapes of White women and that if that were stopped, through the duty of White Christians to gives Blacks "pure religion", all would be well. Gregory spoke from the pulpit at the morning service and gave a talk in the afternoon. Lowery condemned the talk as "unchristian and devoid of spirit" - "a head religion, and not a heart religion". Lowery listed principles of the religion Gregory had noted and then warned the reader of the case of the young Black lawyer who had listened and died ignominiously (Alfonzo Twine). Keystone of Lowery's condemnation was "there was no Christ in it" but this is severe lack of knowledge - Gregory himself had often published on the theme and believed the religion "was an expression of precisely 'the love that Christ taught' and the fulfillment of Christian eschatology, and "it would have been uncharacteristic of him not to have said so." But instead of any version of this kind of presentation Lowery only warned that Gregory had malevolent intentions even though he had a "good, clear voice", was "really eloquent and forceful" but "shrewd enough to conceal his real purposes."

With the death of ʻAbdu'l-Bahá in late 1921 and the designation of the Guardianship of Shoghi Effendi in the spring of 1922, a remodeling and development of the administration of the religion began, including an international pattern of electing national assemblies and increased communication, even locally, with the head of the religion. In 1923 he addressed the local group along with other small communities not yet able to elect a local assembly.

Gregory stayed in Sumter in 1924 for twelve days and eight in Charleston (and ran into Chalence Westendorff, who had found the religion himself and was often arrested for "preaching" on main street) - attended the funeral of his step-father in 1929 in Charleston which was handled by local NAACP founders the Mickey brothers. Klebs addressed the 1925 national convention, saying "… perhaps the best proof that the Cause has been spreading is that from various churches the Baháʼí movement has been denounced."

==== More sustained than sporadic ====
In 1931, Gregory returned again, and also a "team" of Chauncey Northern and Philip Marangella did a musical tour. They spoke to a "campus philosopher," Josiah Morse, whom Gregory had met years ago and who may have been responsible for a quote in the student newspaper that "closely resembled Baháʼí teachings." They also visited Allen University and Benedict College in Columbia and Claflin University and the Colored Normal Industrial Agricultural and Mechanical College of South Carolina in Orangeburg.

At the time, isolated individuals or small groups were noted in Charleston, Columbia, Orangeburg and Sumter. Other individually traveling teachers of the religion include Lorol Schopflocher (1933) and Stanwood Cobb (1934) - Cobb stayed for seven talks across some of March and April, and a study group was established thereafter with two established Baháʼís among the group and they met at the only female physician's home in North Augusta, Marie Kershaw. William and Christine Bidwell, friends of Kershaw having recently moved to the area from Miami where they had joined to the religion, were among a total of about 17 with more or less identification with the religion and a year later elected their first local spiritual assembly (it bridged North August and Augusta.) Klebs was somewhat distant from the group but she was also having medical problems and members of the group tried to help her, as well as the Eliot assembly during her summer there in 1938. She died in January 1939 in Augusta.

The class studied a number of Baháʼí works between 1934 and 1938: Baháʼu'lláh and the New Era, a compilation of letters from Shoghi Effendi, Some Answered Questions and other collections of Abdu'l-Bahá's writings and talks as well as The Dawn-Breakers. In late 1936, Dr. Zia Bagdadi and his family moved to Augusta, the first Persian Baháʼís to live in the area and the community counted some 30 members plus friends and about as many interested contacts. And with a couple of African-Americans, the community was also partially integrated despite frequent presentations in African-American establishments over the years, though it is also true that larger integration could have drawn unwelcome attention. On the other hand, there were no champions of integration insisting on that standard. Dr Bagdadi succeeded in making contacts among African-Americans, notably a doctor, as well as progressively larger and larger meetings at a home, but these suddenly stopped with rumors of the police speaking to the family. However, Bagdadi suddenly died April 1937.

== Slow Growth ==
Increasingly from the 1930s Leroy Ioas, chair of the Baháʼí National Teaching Committee, emphasized "fireside" meetings in individual homes as a key way for individuals to help the religion as well as pioneers, or those who would voluntarily relocate for the advancement of the religion, instead of brief visits by speakers. At the same time Shoghi Effendi initiated steps in implementing the directives of the Tablets of the Divine Plan pushing the American community to diffuse from its few cities to embrace every state in the country as well as international goals starting in South America. The Gregory family moved to Haiti for three months and developed a substantial group of Baháʼís there. And the South became half the focus of the first set of plans for promulgating the religion in more cities starting in 1937. Additionally delegates for the national convention were re-designated to be porpotional to state populations rather simply which communities had assemblies so South Carolina began to hold statewide conventions to elect delegates.

=== Developing multiple communities and national standards ===
A series of movements began across South Carolina for Baháʼís: in 1937 Christine Bidwell and Marie Kershaw from North Augusta tried to foster a group in Aiken, in late 1936-7 two women - Amelie Bodmer and May Fisher - traveled the state in a trailer, in late 1937 Emogene Hoagg and Agnes O'Neill spent the winter in Charleston, and Louise Thompson moved there when they left and then Emogene Hoagg returned in 1939. Hoagg reconnected with Westendorff but while alittle familiar with the beliefs of the religion he didn't confine himself to its teachings and felt he got the right thing to believe by himself. However Hoagg made progress speaking to some groups through the support of her landlady. However Hoagg was asked to go to Cuba to work on bringing the religion there in the fall of 1940. Louise Thompson and Emma Thompson moved to Charleston to try to keep development going.

In late 1938, White women Maud Mickle (Mickle had previous traveled to Brazil with Leonora Holsapple-Armstrong) and Alta Wheeler moved to Columbia where they soon met White woman Louella Moore was friends with the North Augusta community and in early 1939 wrote to be enrolled officially. Their landlady, African-American Pearl Dixon, an AME minister's widow, also converted in 1939 and her daughter in early 1940. African-American Zenobia Dorsey spent the winter in Columbia assisting by being able to reach the Allen University and Benedict College middle-class neighborhoods. They also reached the Palmetto Leader, a Black newspaper, with stories about the Baháʼí House of Worship in Wilmette, Illinois - then the Columbia Record, a White paper, did similarly, and then The State reported "a celebration of Baháʼí New Year at the home of Mickle and Wheeler that drew visitors from Augusta and Charleston."

In the spring of 1938 William (a chiropractor) and Christine Bidwell moved from North Augusta to outside of Greenville and soon moved into town.

Early centers of activity of Baháʼís

Though all the communities had had partial success with gaining interest from African-Americans none had had to deal strongly with opposition in such matters and none of them had made a point of focusing on it as a priority. } A national policy among Baháʼís had started to form from work of Gregory meeting with Baháʼís at Fisk University in 1934, a spiritual assembly in Nashville was elected in 1935, and a regional conference was proposed in 1936 to include a visit from the National Assembly. The development encountered the question of a high-profile series of integrated meetings. Indeed, one of the hotel's hosting one of the six resulting meetings objected and the Baháʼís appeared to relent. W. E. B. DuBois noticed and initially was misinformed of the nature of the resolution to which then secretary of the national assembly Horace Holley responded that the facts were not as DuBois understood them and that it was the hotel that had relented at the last minute - however a policy had been stated that, short of out of control reactions, integrated meetings should be held but in the case of over-reactions segregated meetings could be held with a longer term goal of fully integrated ones theoretically. But in this case the situation was avoided by the change in judgement of the hotel. All of the shifting options became mute when in 1938 a final policy was voiced - published under the title Advent of Divine Justice by Shoghi Effendi with a frank and prolonged discussion of the problem of race prejudice underscoring the short-term requirement and long term goal of complete integration and freedom from racial prejudice. All meetings were to be integrated and individuals to seek to adjust their habits in the matter. In addition, a matter of policy began that in tie votes in elections minorities were to be automatically given approval of the position. One result was the formation of a Race Unity Committee in 1940 with Louis Gregory and Dorothy Beecher Baker, a White descendant of abolitionists. A situation in the Atlanta Baháʼí community was resolved with integration even to the point of letting White people leave the religion if they couldn't accept the standard. Correspondence among South Carolinian communities buzzed with the development.

By the end of 1944, a centennial marker for the religion, groups of Baháʼís were noted in Greenville and Columbia in addition to North Augusta. At the national convention many Baháʼí from South Carolina had their first exposure to the wider Baháʼí community both regionally and internationally, both personally and in written summary, as well as a personal encounter with the Baháʼí House of Worship in Wilmette, Illinois - the object of decades of sacrifice of the national community.

==== Struggling in Greenville ====
The Greenville community had been set against increasing tensions and conflict in society with the Ku Klux Klan. NAACP chapters had been forced to close with economic and as well a violent actions. The Bidwell's, working through the Depression and administrative changes, had been partially lost track of - mistakes redressed in 1939. And the Augusta community also lost track of them. Consequently, the Bidwells and Greenville became a focus of attention in 1940 though most of the assistance came in the form of White women widowers, single, or while their husbands had been drafted in the war. Regardless, by late 1940 an assembly was elected but the population was unstable and soon dissolved. And though August-North Augusta communities initially had enough Baháʼís to independently elect assemblies following the new rule to follow civic boundaries for communities both soon lost assembly status. Consequently, in 1942 specific measured accounting of how many Baháʼís were needed in each location were tallied and specifically filled voluntarily but in coordination so that excess was avoided.

In 1942 and 1943 conferences were held in Greenville to raise awareness among and beyond the Baháʼís and the assembly was elected again in 1943. On the assembly were one family were native Southerners and the only African-Americans of the community, but the only two local Baháʼís were not on the assembly, so the remaining seven were all "transplants", and the two Southerners were elected as two of the four officers and neither of the officers were African-Americans. Overall there were seven women and two men, one of whom was elected as chair. Meanwhile, at least one White influential Baháʼí was uncomfortable with integrated meetings - Emogene Hoagg - and there were reports the FBI was specifically checking on Baháʼís in Greenville who had more forcefully defied Jim Crow laws like Luda Dabrowski and Grace Wilder and social tensions were felt from the tone of traveling teachers of the religion as well as a young African-American woman, Eva Flack McAllister - all this seeming to lower interest from higher social class White people, despite the fact that Shoghi Effendi had continued to hold a standard that Black seekers of the religion should be welcomed equally to White and the White not be given privilege of being first, though not going against public law in arranging for meetings. In effect the caution may have avoided the attention prone to violence, it also dampened the practical outreach to African-Americans where other communities across the South succeeded in gaining converts from both White and Black. Additionally the community was "paralyzed" between the two men on the assembly, who, "loved each other like brothers, and they fought like brothers" in that Chair Bidwell was an alternative healer in non-mainstream ideas dictating meeting arrangements and Williams refusing to attend and asking to be placed in another goal city. By the Fall several Baháʼís left Greenville and the assembly was hamstrung without a quorum. Gregory came to South Carolina in the winter of 1944-5 and toured the Baháʼí communities though the Greenville community remained divided and unstable.

==== Post-War development ====
After the Baháʼí centenary of 1944, Shoghi Effendi designated another goal date of 1952-53 to mark the centenary of Baháʼu'lláh's foundational experience which proceeded in time to form the Baháʼí Faith itself. The Second World War came with various instances of struggle in civil rights in the wider society both before and immediately after the war. The Civil Rights Movement in South Carolina largely expanded after the War, along with massive changes economically such as the primary crop changing from cotton to tobacco and politically such as the election J. Strom Thurmond. In particular to the civil rights of African-Americans, court cases began to proceed such as Briggs v. Elliott. For Baháʼís Shoghi Effendi framed the War and its antecedents and effects as an essential stage on welding humanity "into a single organism". See "The New Negro". The Baháʼís produced a documentary about this The Invisible Soldiers Unheard Voices Low. Baháʼís at the national level made a priority of reaching out to the battered countries of Europe and east Asia for the persecuted Baháʼí communities while continuing the work in South America and the Caribbean and added the initial phases of introducing the religion into Africa more systematically. This was culminated in the Ten Year Crusade that proceeded after the death of Shoghi Effendi though among his last letters he emphasized the work of race unity and reaching out the African-American community in the American South.

A broad US national goal was to focus on communities near the population needed to form assemblies. A regional committee organizing North Carolina, South Carolina, and Georgia was established and made the three cities of South Carolina its goals for South Carolina. Baháʼís from across the region met in each other's cities and across state lines. Regional conferences and long weekend "schools" began to be hosted with at times a hundred participants including African-Americans.

However Gregory and his wife's health declined and further trips to the South were ended and he spent more time contributing in the area of Green Acre, but he wrote letters to contacts of his including South Carolina. He died on July 30, 1951, and was named a Hand of the Cause, the highest personal position of the religion open to anyone, by Shoghi Effendi, posthumously, as was his practice at the time. Indeed, observances for his death were being held by new Baháʼís in Uganda.

The Baháʼís of Columbia did indeed reach assembly status at first with a majority of local Black converts. Regular meetings of the community like the Nineteen Day Feast and observances of Baháʼí Holy Days and talks with returning pioneers and visitors were held even in "seekers" homes across the races and garnered some newspaper coverage. By 1950 the majority were Black Columbians, most with a decade of service in the religion. However, there were incidents where police were called when inter-racial meetings were held sometimes and one home was attacked by the KKK. By 1953 the community had dropped below assembly status again as pioneers moved out of the community and went to Washington, D.C., Switzerland, and New Orleans. Eulalia Barrow Bobo, sister to Joe Louis, visited and gave a talked that much influenced attendees and through several discussions a family of Baptists converted. Then some among their friends converted. By 1962 they were electing an assembly for the county of Columbia as well as the city.

The Greenville community struggled to form a pattern of activity for both Baháʼís and those interested in the religion. For public meetings the group experimented with both separate and mixed meetings - meetings in the Bidwell and Williams homes were separated by race noting the differences by address and times. In 1947 a group of Baháʼís including prominent former diplomat Ali-Kuli Khan met with then mayor J. Kenneth Cass to discuss holding integrated public meetings which turned out to be only possible at the city council chambers, which the Baháʼís then began to use and Khan spoke at the first meeting. Again there were travelers visiting but the overall membership declined down to four in 1952. However the community did gain further recognition from the city council that religious meetings didn't need to be segregated. And in 1956 gained an earnest young couple - Richard and Joy Benson - who moved to Greenville and overcame obstacles like blacklisted for work, and threatening calls at their home when it was clear they socially mingled with African-Americans. They, along with other pioneers, re-elected the assembly in 1957.

The North Augusta community continued to function sometimes at assembly level. Development did, however, extend further across the State. Charleston had sporadic presence of Baháʼís along with other locations - Allendale, Bennettsville, Clemson, Orangeburg, Walterboro, and Union. The religion was also visible in Florence newspapers in 1946, 1955, and 1956.

== The 1960s and 70s ==
A regional long-weekend "Baháʼí school" was held in Frogmore in 1960 and the increased demand by then made it a twice-a-year event from 1960 to 1965. In 1961 seventy Baháʼís showed up for a school registered for 51 held at the Penn Center on Saint Helena Island. Eulalia Bobo was again asked to speak - this time to the islanders there in 1962 and with a pioneer the island elected its first assembly in 1963 and in 1964 it was entirely of African-American. This was against a backdrop of developing civil rights work like the NAACP Congress of Racial Equality chapters multiplying across South Carolina and the overall growth in the movement to the Civil Rights Act of 1964 and Harvey Gantt seeking entry at Clemson University.

From 1959 the rate of people joining the religion statewide was clearly growing - 7 in 1959-60, then 15, then 36 in 1961-2. Music with Baháʼí themes began to be common in the region. A number of newspaper stories mention the religion in the early 1960s:

- A professor from Lander University attended a talk by Rúhíyyih Khanum and then on return gave her own talk later that year.
- North Carolinian Baháʼís visited in Gaffney followed some years later with coverage of the fact that the religion was going to be profiled in an episode of Lamp Unto My Feet on television.
- The Baháʼí Temple was noted in Greenwood.

Florence had a successions of newspaper stories covering events in the community. A Baháʼí scholar stayed several days in Florence where some Chiropractor Baháʼís used advertising too, followed by ex-military Paul Pettit and public observances of Baháʼí Holy Days. Eventually more local people converted and the first assembly of Florence County was elected in 1962. Activity continued into 1963 when there is a profile of the Young family as chiropractors and an assistant, Mrs. Foxworth, known as a Baháʼí. These Florence Baháʼís Jordan and Annette Young had come from Iowa and moved there in 1957 and developed a racially integrated working environment despite obstacles. In 1964 all its members were Black.

In 1961 the Greenville assembly won the right to perform marriages and became incorporated in 1962. It then began to host inter-racial picnics and meetings with Human Rights Day and United Nations Day events proceeding from obscure venues in the late 1950s to premier ones by 1964.

Similar to the opportunities in 1944 of international and nationwide gathering of Baháʼís, the first Baháʼí World Congress was attended by Baháʼís from South Carolina where again the scope of the community was more plain and invigorating to those that attended. "Seeing all these people from different ethnic and religious backgrounds, the beauty of these diverse people coming together for one purpose, I knew it could happen all over the world. It wasn't just in Greenville, South Carolina; this was a world community.…I already knew that, but at the World Congress I saw it." This event saw the election of the Universal House of Justice, the new head of the religion since the death of Shoghi Effendi, for the first time.

The Baháʼí Faith was mentioned in the April 1965 edition of Ebony Magazine with an article "BAHÁ'Í: A way of life for millions" which was a broad review of the religion with many pictures and locations. It also generated seven appreciative letters from Baháʼís or Baháʼí institutions to the editor in the June 1965 issue. The photographer for the story, Lacey Crawford, and his wife, Ethel, converted to the religion and pioneered to Winnsboro, South Carolina, in 1968.

From 1966 to 1969 several people joined the religion in Charleston including two from the North that had come down to strike with the Southern Christian Leadership Conference and were jailed. After being released they went to a Baháʼí meeting and joined the religion. Statewide the population was between 100 and 150.

Nationally the religion was growing too - from 1963 to 1968 it grew by 1/3rd to 18,000. There was a focus for Baháʼís moving to South Carolina to find small towns to move into. Soon the news was that not only were individuals joining the religion but whole families and social networks.

=== Fast growth ===
The growth of the religion in South Carolina was not a single process in a single place - it had various antecedents in various locations - but it was an overall situation that applied in the State as well as elsewhere. One early aspect was a 1969 conference at Frogmore focused on the issues of mass-teaching and various target cities were named as well as others informally including Dillon. In March 1970 Baháʼís going to a conference at Beaufort in the far south of the state and another in April in Colombia. This conference was focused at educators and the profession of education aimed at observing the UN International Education Year of 1970. Speakers at the conference included Benjamin Payton, president of Benedict College and Daniel Jordan of the University of Massachusetts and other institutions including the Baháʼí National Spiritual Assembly. Participants included public school teachers from African American population centers and institutions.

Major activity of Baháʼís

Another was that the Youngs from Florence helped another chiropractic couple, Roger and Sanndy Roff, set up their practice in Dillon and coordinated with another practice, Lee and Genelle in Columbia. The Youngs bought a revival tent capable of seating 250 people and hosted meetings around the state. In the winter of 1969 the three families, in consultation with a regional committee, decided to host a meeting in Dillon and word spread for volunteers to come around Christmas/Winter vacations - around 200 people came at the peak of activity. It was a tremendous success at the time - Young recalled "one snowy day there were over a thousand new believers." On the other hand, Baháʼís had been chased out of nearby Bishopville for two days. The third day a group went straight to the police station and talked to the chief of police for two hours on New Years Day 1970 until he gave the ok for them to be in town. In Dillon meetings of Baháʼís at the homes had eggs thrown at them. In 1971 Baháʼís returning from Dillon in and a contingent of fourteen Baha'is leaving the Dillon area in January, returning in April and into May.

Another factor was that Alberta Williford, later known as Alberta Deas, was moving to South Carolina - she was chair of the Terre Haute community in Indiana in Spring 1969 and she decided to move to Adams Run, South Carolina, where she was born, in August. Shortly after moving there she began to hold meetings and regional conferences where one evening there were 10 simultaneous conversions to the religion and by the end of the weekend a total of 19 did in January 1970. Williford was credited in the Washington Afro-American in 1971 with initiating a conversion program in 1969. By January 1970 she had brought the Baháʼí message to 28 of her neighbors; largely through the efforts of these new converts 100 additional members had been recruited within six months. Williford lead a series of busses to the Baháʼí Temple in March 1971.

The news in 1971 was that the national count of Baháʼís has doubled - The Christian Century noted that in a "one-month, 13-county 'teaching conference' based in Dillon, South Carolina, 9,000 converts, most of them black, joined the Baha'i faith, with hundreds more signing declaration cards in similar efforts throughout the south." And it noted Williford's efforts too. The state with the single largest Baháʼí population was now South Carolina.

In November pictures and a story cover the tents of activities set up around a chiropractor's house Baháʼís from across the nation are visible in a local newspaper and programs describing the teachings of the religion are more visible in February 1972 scattered across the State. Rumors of the intensity of the wave of conversions echo in Lumberton, North Carolina, even in 1975 - meanwhile a statewide conference in South Carolina was held February 1973 and a public presentation of the Baháʼí New year, (Baháʼí Naw-Rúz) was set in nearby Florence. The Baháʼí Faith at the University of South Carolina at Columbia was covered in the student newspaper The Gamecock. Digitization has been run from 1908 to 1988. There are about 45 pages that mention the religion (not including trivial repeats.) All but one are after 1967 but none of the articles mention the spread of the religion in South Carolina - there are a few larger profiles of the religion.

==== Analyses of conversion ====
In the estimation of Louis Venters in his Doctorate in History, the religion had reached a stage of being, on the one hand, ready for growth being imbedded in millennial expectations of Christianity and a "spiritualized polity" of well integrated peoples while on the other hand being numerically a restricted community unable to affect wide scale change or having had any significant period of expansion.

Doctorate in Religion recipient Sandra Kahn notes the parallel between early Christians "going out to spread the 'good news' heedless of personal danger, and the early converts [to the Baháʼí Faith] taking the message to their hearts as fulfillment of their most cherished hopes.… providing a glimpse into the actual scenario of the mass teaching/conversion experience which is so similar to early Christianity" even though "a significant number of Southern fundamentalist Christians who religion orientation is primarily 'other-worldly,' convert to a religion which denies the literal beliefs which they have always held, replacing them with sophisticated symbolic interpretations in a 'this-world' setting." Reviewing a small selection of converts Kahn found "Concrete behavioral change take place. These are changes in habits such as fighting, drinking, "partying", cursing, gambling, gossiping, and promiscuous sexual behavior…. Family relationships become more stable. Racially mixed relationships and marriages occur. There is a tendency to increase one's education, nutritional habits and medical practices. And the convert finds ways to use his own talents to contribute to the religion and personally help others, as well as accepting help." Finding additional parallels with a study of mass conversion in Buddhism she finds "Most of them are poor, illiterate, with centuries of oppression behind them" akin to the Untouchables of India, and represents a stage in escaping the system of oppression, using a popular understanding of the religion's ideas rather than an intellectual one. While many who were initially enthusiastic about conversion fell away, none in Kahn's study formally converted back to Christianity. She found the tendency to convert to the Baha'i Faith transcended other options for those she studied - on the one hand it filled a need for a kind of personal salvation over that of a "civil religion" in the American mythos of civil rights and its "sacred" documents like the Declaration of Independence, and on the other it was more appealing that the Civil Rights Movement with its charismatic preachers and ideals because it was less personal and more a "restatement of the old myth for the purpose of social action". She found that "the two (southern Christian experience and the Baha'i Faith) are compatible for a fruitful encounter. In a sense they are complementary. The Baha'i [faith] provides philosophical explanations, a broader world view, a sense of history, a sense of world unity, explanations of catastrophes and corruption, and in general gives a wider experience of purpose and meaning suitable to the new cultural environment of the South."

Venters continues that the religion succeeded in "Growing against all odds in a hostile environment, it had emerged as a coherent movement with branches in several cities and smaller towns and an unusually diverse body of members. More than any other religious group in the state, it embodied the ideal of the "beloved community" that Martin Luther King, Jr., articulated as the ultimate goal of the civil rights movement: the vision, rooted in Christian millennial expectation, of a spiritualized polity characterized by justice, love, and the "total interrelatedness" of all people." The progress was worked "At the midpoint of the traumatic first year of mandatory statewide school desegregation in South Carolina, as disenchantment with the civil rights movement set in among many Blacks and Whites around the country and the competing rhetorics of Black power and White conservatism dominated the national political discourse, the teams of young Baháʼís taught that God had sent a new Messenger to unite the human race." "Almost overnight, the Baháʼí Faith in South Carolina had gone from a tiny community in a handful of localities to a mass movement with members in every county. In 1970, there were eight Local Spiritual Assemblies in South Carolina; the next year, after the winter project, there were 108, more than any other state in the country. By the middle of 1972, some 20,000 people—mostly African Americans, but hundreds of Native Americans and European Americans as well—had become Baháʼís in South Carolina.… [with] fully one-third of the national community resided in South Carolina." However "Their small numbers," he continues, "severely limited the ability of the Baháʼís in South Carolina and elsewhere to promote the wholesale transformation of society anticipated in their sacred scriptures, and for which enlightened contemporary leaders like King were increasingly calling." "Teachers on the ground in South Carolina, however, were already coming to terms with the difficulties of sustaining such rapid growth. Reinforced by a stream of home-front pioneers and traveling teachers—many of them young adults and new Baháʼís themselves— they set about the difficult business of establishing Baháʼí community structures and practices in dozens of localities scattered across the state."

=== Dizzy Gillespie ===
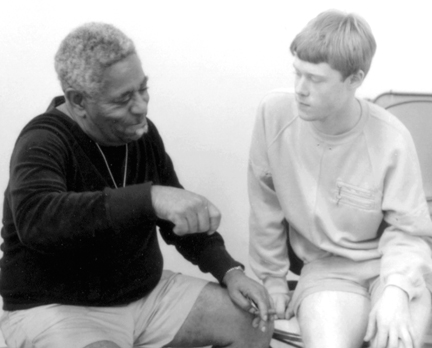

John Birks "Dizzy" Gillespie was born October 21, 1917, in Cheraw, South Carolina, and died January 6, 1993. Dizzy was a Baháʼí since about 1970, was one of the most famous adherents of the religion, which helped him make sense of his position in a succession of trumpeters as well as turning his life from knife-carrying roughneck to global citizen, and from alcohol to "soul force", in the words of author Nat Hentoff, who knew Gillespie for forty years. Gillespie's conversion was most affected by Bill Sears's book Thief in the Night. Gillespie spoke about the Baháʼí Faith frequently on his trips abroad.

=== Louis Gregory Institute/WLGI ===
Venter's thesis notes "In Georgetown County near Hemingway, a White couple, former Pentecostal ministers who had led most of their congregation into the faith, sold a large tract of family land to the National Spiritual Assembly to establish such a facility. Inaugurated in October 1972 and named for the South Carolina movement's most prominent native son, the Louis G. Gregory Baháʼí Institute became a hub of activity in the state and region …"

Come the fall of 1972 the national assembly dedicated the Louis Gregory Institute(LGI). Local Baháʼí Willard Brown died in November 1972 as well. Programs of delineating the religion continued in December 1972 and into 1973, and observed its decade anniversary in 1983. A campaign was established in the mid-1980s supported by the Continental Board of Counselors "…resulted in some 2500 new enrolments, the settlement of new home-front pioneers in several localities, and initial use of an innovative curriculum—developed by Baháʼís in Colombia(the country in South America) and used increasingly throughout Latin America—for training new believers as teachers. The number of Local Spiritual Assemblies in the state rose to some 275." Following this and a fund-raising campaign the Louis Gregory Institute set up a radio station. The expertise of setting up Baháʼí radio stations in several Latin America in the later 1970s and 1980s was brought to help set up WLGI in Hemingway. Afterwards Dizzy Gillespie brought his band to play in the area in 1986.

In the late 1980s Baháʼís in the state continued to hold initiatives for growth of the religion, and make the news occasionally beyond the particulars of LGI:

- The Promise of World Peace being one case of an effort of the religion
- participation at the second Baháʼí World Congress

== Modern Presence ==
In the 1990s the Universal House of Justice, the current head of the religion, announced a decades-long effort to develop human resources and institutional capacity to sustain growth around the world. Youth activation, organization at a cluster level, training programs were initiated and expanded as resources and orientation became available. "By 2008 and 2009, membership growth in the country as a whole had returned to the level of the mid-1980s." A nationwide county-by-county breakdown of Baháʼí populations ranks some counties in South Carolina as among the highest in the nation, (with a few in Georgia and South Dakota also notable): Marion at 10%, Williamsburg at 7.2%, and Dillon at about 6.3% in 2010, though the area of the county of Colleton where levels of activity had been high, were less than a third and closer to the statewide average. The fact that the Baháʼís formed the second largest percentage of the religious in the whole of South Carolina made the news in 2014 even convincing a skeptic - Mark Silk, and avowed atheist Herb Silverman, founding leader of Secular Coalition for America, took the opportunity from the news to check out the local Charleston Baháʼís - and was favorably disposed. Coverage by WMBF News in eastern South Carolina occurred in February 2016. And based on data from 2010, Baháʼís were the largest minority religion in 80 counties out of the 3143 counties in the country, including a few from South Carolina: Anderson, Horry, and Williamsburg.

Baháʼís run a museum on Louis Gregory.

=== Notable South Carolinian Baháʼís ===
In addition to Louis Gregory and Dizzy Gillespie a number of South Carolinian Baháʼís have been in the news or otherwise been prominent:

- Susan Audé is a retired American television news anchor in Columbia, South Carolina, who had worked her entire career from a wheel-chair.
- Anisa Kintz made news as a child more than once, and won a Prudential Spirit of Community Award in 1996. Then Kintz was more broadly noted with a conference Calling All Colors, for which she was noted in React Magazine's "Take Action" awards in 1997, was profiled in an Odyssey Channel special also covering Dan Seals on the issue of racism, and won a Points of Light award. She earned a Discover Card silver "Tribute scholarship".
- Jack E. McCants was from Texas and was an ex-minister who converted to the religion. He pioneered to Guam c. 1973, and moved to South Carolina to work as the director of Beckman Center for Mental Health Services in Greenwood. He served on the national assembly of the Baháʼís of the United States c. 2000, and been visible in local news as a Baháʼí.
- Louis Venters of Francis Marion University who wrote a PhD on the religion in the state has won an award and has been consulted by media for the news of the religion in the State.
- Muhiyidin Moye (1985 – 6 February 2018) also known as Muhiyidin D'baha was a leading Black Lives Matter activist known nationally for crossing a yellow police tape line to snatch a Confederate battle flag from a demonstrator on live television in Charleston, South Carolina, in February 2017.

== See also ==
- History of South Carolina
- Religion in South Carolina
- Baháʼí Faith and the unity of humanity
