= CFHK =

CFHK may refer to:

- CFHK-FM, a radio station in St. Thomas, Ontario, Canada
- Cards for Hospitalized Kids, US charity
