= OEV =

OEV may refer to:

- A location of Occupy Eugene
- Abbreviation for L'Œuvre, a group in Architecture of Switzerland
- Venezuelan Electoral Observatory (Spanish: Observatorio Electoral Venezolano), an observing group in the 2017 Venezuelan municipal elections
- Opened-eye visuals, an effect of the street drug 2C-B
- Operation Earnest Voice (OEV), a communications programme by the United States Central Command
- Other Exempt Vehicles, a classification of vehicles for Vehicle registration plates of the Philippines
- Optional Exchange Vehicle program for Armored Multi-Purpose Vehicle
