= Susan Audé =

American television news anchor

- Born: October 31, 1952 (age 73)
- Other names: Susan Bloxham, Susan Fisher
- Known for: news anchor working in a wheelchair

Susan Audé (born October 31, 1952) is a retired American television news anchor in Columbia, South Carolina at WIS-TV. A child of military service parents she entered adulthood from Virginia to Erskine College in South Carolina in 1972 when she was seriously injured in a car accident in 1974. She spent six months in the hospital. Living the rest of her life in a wheelchair, she overcame depression and anger at the time and earned degrees and a career in television news broadcast, starting in 1978 until retirement in 2006, as well as working in theatre and public speaking. Raised a Methodist, she converted to the Baháʼí Faith in 1995 and she says it broadened her views of society and religion.

== Personal life ==
Audé was born on Halloween 1952 into a military family living in many locations - she graduated from high school in Germany and was in Fort Lee, Virginia about the time she went to college.

Audé attended Erskine College from about 1972 because an aunt and uncle attended, served as a dorm representative to the student government council, and was a runner-up in the contest for Homecoming Queen. In 1974, Audé was in a car hit by a truck - two were killed and two others injured - during her junior year, and sustained severe internal injuries. She recovered but was left paralyzed from the waist down. She has spent her life since then in a wheelchair. Following a year of hospitalization and rehabilitation, during which she had depression and anger, she went on to finish her college education, competed for national Miss Wheelchair America after winning at Virginia's Miss Wheelchair, Paralympic Games with distinction in javelin and shot put contests, was elected Erskine Homecoming Queen in 1975–76, and earned an A. B. in English and Spanish in 1976. She earned a master's degree in journalism/communications from the University of South Carolina at Columbia in 1978 and joined Kappa Tau Alpha.

Audé has often spoken of how her spiritual faith shaped her life. In 1995, while attending a Methodist Church where she was teaching Sunday School and attended seminary classes, Audé began a period of intense study of the Baháʼí Faith across some three years before converting following contact with a friend of her daughter's parents and her own exploration including some 20 books in about a year. The conversion brought awareness of her social circle having limited exposure to people of other races, and provided an optimism of the future of humanity and affirmed her sense of ethics for journalists. She has organized Baháʼí study circles, and assisted in Baháʼí publication.

During her newscaster career Audé was actively involved in many activities and organizations and upon her retirement in 2006 she was awarded the state's highest civilian honor: The Order of the Palmetto for her contributions to the state by then Governor Mark Sanford.

Audé married Kevin Fisher in 1982. She was known as Susan Audé Fisher on-air until their 2001 divorce. They have a grown daughter, Blythe.

== Careers ==
=== Broadcasting ===
Audé entered the television news business inspired by Barbara Walters 12 years before the Americans with Disabilities Act of 1990 initially as weather announcer and reporter. "If I went to cover a story that was on a second floor of a building that didn't have elevators or ramps," Audé said in a 2006 interview on the Today Show, "I couldn't go back to the newsroom and say 'I couldn't get the story.'"

Initially hired as a "weather girl" she was visible on the intro to the station's new during the intro. After a year at WIS-TV she was a weekend anchor, and by 1982 she joined longtime anchorman Ed Carter on the weekday newscasts as the first full-time female anchor in Columbia television history. She and Carter were together for 16 years until Carter's retirement in 1998.

In 1981 she was elected president of the state chapter of the Associated Press Broadcasters Association.

Audé announced her retirement on February 1, 2006, after 28 years as a television news reporter and anchor. Susan decided to retire after a hip fracture.

=== Speaker and services ===
In 1983 Audé returned to Erskine to give the first "Cardwell speaker", In 1984 and 1989 she addressed a legislative conference. In 1985 she gave the commencement speech at the Valencia Community College's Computer Programmer Training for the Disabled. In 1995 she addressed the graduating class of Erskine College and was named as a new member of the board of trustees of the college and a vp of a committee that raised funds for the college in 1998. In 1996 she helped with the Columbus Musical Festival Association, was interviewed by Clemson-based Making It Grow! educational television program, and was part of the carrying of the Olympic torch through South Carolina for the 1996 Summer Olympics in Atlanta. In 1998 she spoke to a chapter of the Daughters of the American Revolution.

Her life and accomplishments have been the subject of stories in Good Housekeeping and Ms. magazines, as well as on CNN and Lifetime cable channels and Sally Jesse Raphael. In 2003 Audé hosted a South Carolina Educational Television documentary on special-care children.

In 2010 Audé was emcee at an April 2010 tea party rally in front of the South Carolina Statehouse.

=== For the Baháʼí Faith ===
Since retiring from broadcasting as a professional career she has traveled, given talks, and worked part-time at Baháʼí Radio, WLGI, in South Carolina including interviews of Baháʼís for broadcast. She was interviewed on the radio program and podcast series A Baháʼí Perspective as well as contributing to its body of work reviewing authors of books at the library at the Louis Gregory Institute.

=== Theatre career ===
Audè has appeared in a variety of plays. In 1972 she appeared in What did we do wrong? by Henry Denker while attending Erskine College, as well as publishing some poetry. In the late 1980s Audé appeared in two films - Distortions (1987) as Mourner #9, and in Staying Together (film) (playing herself). Audé played Madame Rosemonde in Workshop Theatre of South Carolina's January/February 2009 production of Les Liaisons Dangereuses (Dangerous Liaisons).

== Awards and honors ==
Audé received dozens of honors across her life. While at the University of South Carolina for her master's degree, she was added to the "Who's who among students in American Universities and Colleges" as rookie of the year. Good Housekeeping listed her as one of its "100 Young Women of Promise". In 1988 Columbia University awarded her an honorary doctorate in humanities, and was awarded the Handicapped Professional of the US and was a runner up for the international award for the state chapter of "Pilot International". In 1998, Audé was named to the University of South Carolina College of Journalism's "Diamond Circle". In 1999 she won the "Sullivan Award" from Erskine College. The Governor's Commission on Women honored Audé with its 2001 Woman of Achievement Award which is presented for "remarkable accomplishments and commitment to our state". In 2006 she was awarded the state's highest civilian honor: The Order of the Palmetto for her contributions to the state by then Governor Mark Sanford.

== See also ==
- Marty Ravellette, a Baháʼí born without arms.
- Baháʼí Faith in South Carolina
