= Jen Rubino =

- Education: Maine South High School Georgetown University George Washington University
- Known for: Founded Cards for Hospitalized Kids

Jen Rubino (born 1994 or 1995) is the founder of the American charity Cards for Hospitalized Kids (or CFHK for short) which helps seriously ill children through handmade cards. Rubino's own experiences in the hospital inspired her to start CFHK. She has shared her story and that of her charity, Cards for Hospitalized Kids, in publications around the USA and world. Rubino attended Maine South High School, and is now a student at George Washington University in Washington D.C.

== Background ==
Rubino began gymnastics at age four, and quickly developed a love for the sport. She began competing at a young age, and dreamed of one day going to the Olympics. However, at age 11, doctors discovered that pain in her wrist originally thought to be from a sports injury was actually from a connective tissue and bone disease. She was forced to end her career in gymnastics, and began treatment for her condition. In the years following, Rubino underwent over 20 major surgeries, and was frequently in and out of the hospital, where she saw firsthand the struggles faced by hospitalized kids. In February 2011, Rubino was in the Intensive Care Unit in the hospital, recovering from a very difficult surgery. She was facing a very difficult time, and receiving a handmade card really brightened her day. This gave her the idea of starting her charity, which she started soon after.

Since inception, Rubino's charity has achieved nationwide impact and over 5000,000 kids at Children’s hospitals and Ronald McDonald Houses nationwide have received cards from CFHK. Cards are delivered to hospitals monthly. Rubino has recruited many World and Olympic gymnasts such as Aly Raisman and Nastia Liukin as well as celebrities such as Lauren Conrad to get involved with her charity. Celebrity supporters help Rubino's efforts by donating autographs for hospitalized children to receive from her, and by helping spread the word on social media. Rubino is a resident of Illinois and attends Maine South High School.

== Media coverage ==
Rubino has shared her personal story, and the impact and journey of her charity, in publications around the world including the Chicago Tribune, B96 Radio, International Gymnast Magazine, LifeStyle and Charity Magazine and MTV Act among others. She is also a writer, and has shared her story in writing, in publications such as The Huffington Post, Maria Shriver's story-telling website, and more. Rubino has used this media coverage to not only further her charity, but also spread her message on the importance of giving back. She hopes to expand upon this in the future by writing a book and doing public speaking.

== Awards ==
Rubino has earned many honors and awards for her service efforts making a difference for thousands of hospitalized kids by founding and running Cards for Hospitalized Kids. In 2012, she was named a “Girl in Action” by Teen Voices Magazine and was a finalist for Glamour Magazine’s Women of the Year Reader’s Choice Award in 2012.

At the end of 2012, Points of Light awarded Rubino a Daily Point of Light Award for her work doing Cards for Hospitalized Kids. The Point of Light Award was created by President George H.W Bush to "honor individuals and groups creating meaningful change in communities across America". To this day, President Bush continues to sign all of the awards.

In 2013, Rubino was once again honored for her work doing Cards for Hospitalized Kids when she was awarded the Prudential Spirit of Community Award from Prudential Financial, which was presented to her at her high school's honors night. Following this honor, Rubino was recognized by the Illinois General Assembly. They created a measure to honor her for her service work. In Summer 2013, Rubino was honored for her service efforts by Kohl's through the Kohl's Cares Scholarship Program. She received a scholarship for college, along with this honor. The Mayor and City Council of Park Ridge, IL, which is Rubino's hometown, also honored her for her service work, by recognizing her at a City Council Meeting in July 2013. At the meeting, Rubino told audience members her story, and spoke of the importance of service.
