= Louis George Gregory =

American Bahá'í

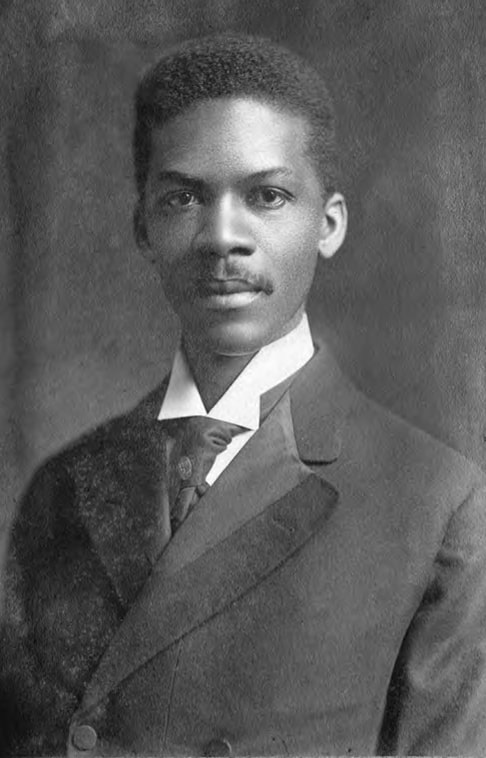
- Gregory in his youth, likely graduating from Fisk University in 1896
- Born: June 6, 1874; Charleston, South Carolina
- Died: July 30, 1951 (aged 77); South Eliot, Maine
- Burial place: Mount Pleasant Cemetery, South Eliot, Maine

Louis George Gregory (June 6, 1874 – July 30, 1951) was a prominent American member of the Baháʼí Faith who was devoted to its expansion in the United States and elsewhere. He traveled especially in the South to spread his religion as well as advocating for racial unity.

In 1922, he was the first African American elected to the nine-member National Spiritual Assembly of the United States and Canada. He was repeatedly re-elected to that position, leading a generation and more of followers. He also worked to proselytize the faith to Central and South America.

Gregory was among the elite group of educated African American leaders whom W. E. Du Bois referred to as "the talented tenth."

Gregory was posthumously appointed by Shoghi Effendi in 1951 as a Hand of the Cause, the highest appointed rank in the Baháʼí Faith.

== Early years ==
=== Early life ===
Louis George was born in Charleston, South Carolina, on June 6, 1874, the second son of Ebenezer F. and Mary Elizabeth George. Both of his parents were formerly enslaved African Americans who were emancipated during the Civil War.

His mother Mary Elizabeth was the daughter of Mary Bacot, an enslaved African, and her white enslaver George Washington Dargan of the Rough Fork plantation in Darlington, South Carolina. Bacot was "wholly of African blood," and her spiritual teachings inspired Gregory. Bacot married a blacksmith who became a grandfather figure to Gregory.

In 1878, when Louis was four years old, his father Ebenezer died.

He was raised by his stepfather, Colonel George Gregory, who had fought for the Union army.

Circa 1881, when Gregory was 7 years old, he witnessed the lynching of his grandfather by "a hate-inspired mob of white men," possibly Ku Klux Klan members jealous of his financial success as a blacksmith. Biographer Elsie Austin claimed the "bitterness and distortion which might have developed from this experience were deflected by the prayers and teaching of his grandmother, whose life was miraculously spared by the mob."

In 1881, Louis's mother remarried to George Gregory, who was the only freeman of African descent to join the Union Army from the 3000 in Charleston at the time. George Gregory rose to 1st Sgt. in the 104th United States Colored Troops (USCT) after being recruited by Major Delaney, of African descent. After the war, he was honorifically called Colonel Gregory and his family received a Civil War pension. At this point Louis George Gregory took the name of his stepfather. Due to his military service, his stepson Louis George Gregory was introduced in family situations to make friends with the European descent children of Army officers who would visit the home. George Gregory was also a leader in the community, playing a significant role in the inter-racial United Brotherhood of Carpenters and Joiners of America; upon his death in 1929, the Union put out an advertisement in the Charleston Newspaper asking all Union members to attend, 1000 of both races did make it to Monrovia Union Cemetery, where headstones to George and Mary Elizabeth stand to this day.

=== Education ===
During his elementary schooling, Louis Gregory attended the Avery Institute, the first public school open to both African American and white children in Charleston. George and Mary Elizabeth wanted children, but she lost many as infants. Mary Elizabeth died in 1891, three months after giving birth; that infant died soon after birth. Gregory's older brother Theodore died the same year. Gregory still graduated from the Avery Institute, and gave the graduation speech entitled, "Thou Shalt Not Live For Thyself Alone." Avery Institute honors Gregory by displaying his portrait in their preserved classroom.

Gregory gained a stepbrother, Harrison Gregory, when his stepfather married the widow Lauretta Gregory. Lauretta's husband, Louis Noisette, a Civil War veteran, had died while she was pregnant with Harrison.

The Noisette family became prominent in Charleston after leaving Saint-Domingue. Philippe Stanislas Noisette was the young son of a Nantes horticulturalist working for the King of France. His father sent him to Saint-Domingue to send back exotic flowers. While there he married Celestine, who was of African descent. They fled the violence of the Haitian Revolution to Charleston, together with two of Celestine's family members.

Because of the miscegenation laws of South Carolina, Philippe had to declare Celestine a slave in order to have her live with him. They had six children together, who were mixed-race. In 1809 he requested manumission of one of the family members, but the legislature refused it.

One of the two men fathered Benjamin who became enslaved by the Solomon family. Benjamin's children recorded in an 1893 deposition that throughout their enslavement their father made clear to them to remember their last name was Noisette rather than that of their enslaver. Harrison escaped enslavement in 1862 and joined the Union Navy on May 6, 1862, in Port Royal, South Carolina. Benjamin also escaped enslavement in 1862 and went on to the freeman's Camp Barker, as it was known then, in Washington, D.C. Gregory's step-brother's father Louis Noisette remained enslaved until African-American soldiers liberated Charleston in February 1865. He then joined the 33rd USCT Regiment as a drummer to help liberate his mother and sister who remained enslaved in Savannah. After the war Louis Noisette married Lauretta, and had the child Harrison Noisette who became Harrison Gregory.

=== University and professional years ===
Gregory's generous stepfather paid for his first year at Fisk University in Nashville, Tennessee, where he studied English literature. Using the tailoring skills his mother had taught him he managed the finances needed for the rest of his bachelor's degree. There being no law schools that would accept him in the South, he continued on to Howard University in Washington, D.C., one of the few universities to accept black graduate students, to study law and received his LL.B degree in Spring 1902. He was admitted to the bar, and along with another young lawyer, James A. Cobb, opened a law office in Washington, D.C. The partnership ended in 1906, after Gregory started to work in the United States Department of the Treasury. In 1904 Gregory was listed as a supporter of the committee for a celebration of Booker T. Washington. In 1906 Gregory served as vice president of the Howard University Law School Alumni association. Gregory had been attracted to the Niagara Movement and active in the Bethel Literary and Historical Society, a Negro organization devoted to discussing issues of the day – he had been elected a vice president in 1907 and president in 1909. Meanwhile, Gregory was visible in the newspapers over racist incidents.

== As a Baháʼí ==
=== Encountering the religion ===
At the Treasury Department, Gregory met Thomas H. Gibbs, with whom he formed a close relationship. Gibbs, while not being a Baháʼí himself, shared information about the religion to Gregory, and Gregory attended a lecture by Lua Getsinger, a leading Baháʼí, in 1907. In that meeting he met Pauline Hannen and her husband who invited him to many other meetings through the next couple of years, and Gregory was much affected by the behavior of the Hannens and the religion after having become disillusioned with Christianity. Among the readings Gregory reviewed on the religion was an early edition of The Hidden Words. The meetings were also held among the poor at a school and a Baháʼí view of Christian scripture and prophecy much affected him and presented a framework for a reformulation of society. While the Hannens went on pilgrimage in 1909 to visit ʻAbdu'l-Bahá, then head of the religion, in Palestine, Gregory left the Treasury Department and established his practice in Washington, D.C. When the Hannens returned, Gregory once again started attending meetings on the religion and the burgeoning Baháʼí community of DC was holding more and more meetings - particularly integrated meetings of the Hannens and some others. ʻAbdu'l-Bahá also began to communicate either in letters or to those that visited on pilgrimage a preference for integration. On July 23, 1909, Gregory wrote to the Hannens that he was an adherent of the Baháʼí Faith:

It comes to me that I have never taken occasion to thank you specifically for all your kindness and patience, which finally culminated in my acceptance of the great truths of the Baháʼí Revelation. It has given me an entirely new conception of Christianity and of all religion, and with it my whole nature seems changed for the better...It is a sane and practical religion, which meets all the varying needs of life, and I hope I shall ever regard it as a priceless possession.

=== First actions ===
At this point, Gregory started organizing meetings for the religion as well, including one under the auspices of the Bethel Literary and Historical Society, a Negro organization of which he was president previously. He also wrote to ʻAbdu'l-Bahá, who responded to Gregory that he had high expectations of Gregory in the realm of race relations. The Hannens asked that Gregory attend some organizational meetings to help consult on opportunities for the religion. With such meetings the practical aspects of integration with some Baháʼís became crystallized while for others it became a strain they had to work to overcome. Gregory received a letter in November 1909 from ʻAbdu'l-Bahá saying:

I hope that thou mayest become... the means whereby the white and colored people shall close their eyes to racial differences and behold the reality of humanity, that is the universal truth which is the oneness of the kingdom of the human race.... Rely as much as thou canst on the True One, and be thou resigned to the Will of God, so that like unto a candle thou mayest be enkindled in the world of humanity and like unto a star thou mayest shine and gleam from the Horizon of Reality and become the cause of the guidance of both races.

In 1910 Gregory stopped working as a lawyer and began a long period of service, holding meetings and traveling for the religion and writing and lecturing on the subject of racial unity. Some initial meetings were held in parallel among the races, but ʻAbdu'l-Bahá made it known that the direction of the community was toward integrated meetings. The fact that upper class white Baháʼís repeatedly achieved steps towards integration was a confirmation to Gregory of the power of the religion. Gregory, still president of the Bethel Literary and Historical Society, arranged for presentations by several Baháʼís to the group.

Gregory initiated a major trip through the South. He traveled to Richmond, Virginia; Durham and other locations in North Carolina; Charleston, South Carolina, the city of his family and childhood; and Macon, Georgia, where he told people about the religion. In Charleston he is known to have presented talks at the Carpenter's Union Hall. He contacted a priest who had encountered the religion at Green Acre in Maine, where he met Mírzá Abu'l-Faḍl. In Charleston Alonzo Twine converted; he was an African-American lawyer and the first known Baháʼí of South Carolina. But Twine was later committed to a mental institution by his mother and family priest, where he died a few years later. He continued to hand out Baháʼí pamphlets he had made himself.

Gregory began to participate more in the early Baháʼí administration. In February 1911 he was elected to Washington's Working Committee of the Baháʼí Assembly, the first African American to serve in that position. In April 1911 Gregory served as an officer of Harriet Gibbs Marshall's Washington Conservatory of Music and School of Expression, along with George William Cook of Howard University and others. The school was advertised, especially in black publications, in several cities across the country.

=== Pilgrimage ===
In late 1910 ʻAbdu'l-Bahá invited Gregory to go on pilgrimage. Gregory sailed from New York City on March 25, 1911. He traveled overland through Europe to Palestine and Egypt. In Palestine, Gregory met with ʻAbdu'l-Bahá, where he also visited the Shrine of Baháʼu'lláh and the Shrine of the Báb. In Egypt he met with Shoghi Effendi. While in the Mideast, he discussed the race issue in the United States with ʻAbdu'l-Bahá and the other pilgrims. ʻAbdu'l-Bahá said there was no distinction between the races. During this time, ʻAbdu'l-Bahá started encouraging Gregory and Louisa Mathew, a white English pilgrim, to get to know each other.

After leaving Egypt, Gregory traveled to Germany, where he spoke at a number of gatherings to Baháʼís and their friends. When he returned to the United States, he continued to travel, mainly in the southern United States to talk about the Baháʼí faith.

He held his first public meeting on the religion after his return, and published an article under his own name in the Washington Bee in November, inspired by ʻAbdu'l-Bahá in Britain that month. He was elected to a Washington Baháʼí working committee.

=== 1912 ===
In April Gregory was elected to the national Baháʼí "executive board". He assisted during ʻAbdu'l-Bahá's visit to the United States, during which he repeatedly emphasized the Baháʼí Faith and the oneness of humanity; he used black-colored references for pictures of beauty and virtue. See ʻAbdu'l-Bahá's journeys to the West.

ʻAbdu'l-Bahá thanked Gregory's efforts on several occasions. The first was on 23 April 1912 when ʻAbdu'l-Bahá attended several events; first he spoke at Howard University to over 1000 students, faculty, administrators and visitors — an event commemorated in 2009. He attended a reception by the Persian Charge-de-Affairs and the Turkish Ambassador. At the reception, ʻAbdu'l-Bahá moved the place-cards to seat Gregory, the only African American, at the head table next to him.

ʻAbdu'l-Bahá spoke at Bethel Literary and Historical Society where Gregory had long been involved and served as president.

Later in June ʻAbdu'l-Bahá addressed the NAACP national convention in Chicago, which was reported by W. E. B. Du Bois in The Crisis.

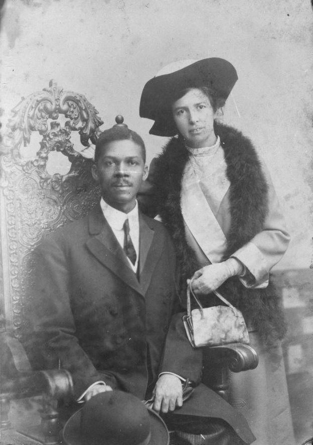
Gregory and Louisa A. M. Mathew Gregory, likely their 1912 marriage portrait

Gregory and Louisa Mathew had deepened their relationship. They married on September 27, 1912, becoming the first known Baháʼí interracial couple.

When Louisa accompanied Gregory during his travels in the United States, they encountered a range of different reactions. Interracial marriage was illegal or unrecognized in a majority of the states at that time.

=== Succeeding years of service ===
The Washington Baháʼí community struggled to conduct only integrated meetings and establish integrated institutions in Spring 1916. That summer they received ʻAbdu'l-Bahá's earliest Tablets of the Divine Plan. Joseph Hannen, with whom Gregory worked on a committee, received the Tablet for the South. Republicans had earlier established integrated facilities in the capital for the federal government, but the election of Woodrow Wilson had resulted in his directing segregation in numerous facilities, to satisfy Southerners in his cabinet.

By December Gregory had traveled among 14 of the 16 southern states named, speaking mostly to student audiences, which were overwhelmingly segregated by law. He began a second round in 1917. The NAACP was founding chapters in South Carolina starting in 1918. But since 1915, there had been a revival of the KKK, and there was other social unrest associated with tensions over the Great War in Europe, which the US entered in 1917. Gregory knew many of the initial organizers of the NAACP.

In 1919, the remaining letters of the ʻAbdu'l-Bahá arrived. He used the example of St. Gregory the Illuminator as a model of effort to spread the religion. Hannen and Gregory were subsequently elected to a committee focused on the American South and Gregory focused on two approaches - presenting the religion's teachings on race issue to social leaders as well as to the general public - and initiated his next more extensive trip from 1919 to 1921 often with Roy Williams, an African-American Baháʼí from New York City. During 1920 a pilgrim returned from seeing ʻAbdu'l-Bahá with a focus on initiating conferences on race issues called "Race Amity Conferences" and Gregory consulted by letter on how to begin. The first one was held May 1921 in Washington, D.C.

Gregory met Josiah Morse of the University of South Carolina. Starting in the 1930s, several Baháʼís speakers began to appear at university-based events. Gregory developed a friendship with Samuel Chiles Mitchell, president of the University of South Carolina (1909–1913), and shared that ʻAbdu'l-Bahá's views he heard at the Lake Mohonk Conference on International Arbitration affected him in his interracial work into the 1930s.

Gregory also faced increasing opposition. In January 1921 he spoke in Columbia, SC, where some African-American ministers warned against his message and religion. Others invited Gregory to speak to their congregations. One of the ministers who opposed him had assisted in getting the first declared Baháʼí in the state committed to an institution for the mentally insane.

In 1922 Gregory was the first African American to be elected to the National Spiritual Assembly of the United States and Canada, a nine-person body to which he would be repeatedly elected in 1924, 1927, 1932, 1934 and 1946. His correspondence and activities were often covered in local newspapers in the US and beyond.

In 1924 Gregory toured the country to numerous speaking engagements. He often appeared with Alain LeRoy Locke, a fellow Baháʼí and prominent African-American thinker of the Harlem Renaissance.

Gregory's father died in 1929. He had praised Gregory for his work, marriage, and principles; although he never converted, he also was known to hand out Gregory's pamphlets. An estimated one thousand people attended the funeral, where Gregory read Baháʼí prayers.

In the 1930s Gregory worked in intra- and international developments of the religion. In December 1931 he helped start a Baháʼí study class in Atlanta. He lived in Nashville, Tennessee, for several months, where he worked with inquirers from Fisk University. Some helped found that city's first local Spiritual Assembly.

In response to Shoghi Effendi's call for the goals of the Tablets of the Divine Plan, the United States community arranged a program of action. Gregory and his wife Louisa traveled to and lived in Haiti in 1934 promoting the religion. The Haitian government asked them to leave in a matter of months; Catholicism was the dominant established religion.

In 1940 the Atlanta Baháʼí community struggled over integrated meetings. Gregory was among those tasked with resolving the situation in favor of integrated meetings. In early 1942 Gregory spoke at several black schools and colleges in West Virginia, Virginia, and the Carolinas. He also served on the first "assembly development" committee, focused on supporting materials to expand the religion in Central and South America. In 1944 Gregory was on the planning committee for the "All-America Convention", which was attracting attendees from all Baháʼí national communities, both north and south. He wrote the convention report for the Baháʼí News national journal. He traveled from the winter of 1944 through 1945 among five southern states.

Newspapers covered the Race Amity conventions organized by Baháʼís from the 1920s through the 1950s, against a backdrop of persistent racial issues and violence in the US.

=== Later years ===
In December 1948, Gregory suffered a stroke while returning from a friend's funeral. His wife's health was also declining and the couple began to stay closer to home. They lived at Green Acre Baháʼí School in Eliot, Maine. Gregory carried on correspondence with U.S. District Court Judge Julius Waties Waring and his wife in 1950-1; Waring was involved in Briggs v. Elliott.

Gregory died July 30, 1951 at age 77 in Eliot, Maine. He is buried at Mount Pleasant Cemetery in Eliot near the Green Acre Baháʼí school. His wife sought comfort with the Noisette family in New York after his death.

== Legacy and honors ==
- On his death, Shoghi Effendi, then head of the religion, cabled to the American Baháʼí community:

Profoundly deplore grievous loss of dearly beloved, noble-minded, golden-hearted Louis Gregory, pride and example to the Negro adherents of the Faith. Keenly feel loss of one so loved, admired and trusted by ʻAbdu'l-Bahá. Deserves rank of first Hand of the Cause of his race. Rising Baháʼí generation in African continent will glory in his memory and emulate his example. Advise hold memorial gathering in Temple in token recognition of his unique position, outstanding services.

- Gregory was among Shoghi Effendi's first round of appointees to the distinguished rank named Hands of the Cause. Memorial observances of Gregory's death were among the first events of the newly arrived Baháʼís and first converts in Uganda.
- The Baháʼí radio station WLGI is named after Gregory: the Louis Gregory Institute.
- The Louis Gregory Preschool in Lesotho Africa is named for him.
- The Louis G. Gregory Bahá'í Museum in Charleston South Carolina is a memorial to the life and work of its namesake.
