= Muhiyidin Moye =

Activist

- Born: April 22, 1985; Poughkeepsie, New York, U.S.
- Died: February 6, 2018 (aged 32); New Orleans, Louisiana, U.S.
- Education: University of South Carolina (BA); Winthrop University (MA)

Muhiyidin El Amin Moye (April 22, 1985 – February 6, 2018), also known as Muhiyidin d'Baha, was a leading Black Lives Matter activist known nationally for crossing a yellow police tape line to snatch a Confederate battle flag from a demonstrator on live television in Charleston, South Carolina, in February 2017.

== Life ==
Moye, an African-American, was born in Poughkeepsie, New York, and as a teen the family moved to Hollywood, South Carolina. He attended University of South Carolina and in 2006 suffered severe burns from an arson attack at a house he was staying at. He went on to attend Winthrop University, finishing in 2011. That fall he appeared at Occupy Eugene. Back in Charleston he found and joined the Baháʼí Faith around 2014 and soon was visible in the news following the shooting of Walter Scott and being known as a Black Lives Matter activist in 2015. After some more work in 2016 Moye became involved in a February 2017 Bree Newsome speaking engagement that drew protestors and counter protestors during which he made a leap crossing police lines to take down an oversized Confederate battle flag that happened to occur during a news broadcast and so was caught on live television.

== Death ==
Moye went to New Orleans and while riding a bicycle through the midnight streets on February 6, 2018, he was shot, traveled on some blocks, left his bike and called for help to which police responded and took him to the hospital. However he had lost too much blood and died in the morning.

== Activism ==
Moye rose to local prominence after the shooting of Walter Scott by North Charleston, South Carolina, police in 2015. Moye arranged a meeting in which Scott's family first viewed eyewitness Feidin Santana's video of the shooting. Also in 2015, Moye met with Bernie Sanders - where Sanders said "Let me be very clear. Nobody will fight harder to end institutional racism and to reform our broken criminal justice system." Moye said "Bernie's going through his own evolution. Coming from Vermont and being in the space of white privilege that he's enjoyed, he's gonna go through an experience of learning."

But Moye's activism goes back at least to 2011 when he was visible at the Occupy Eugene event in October. In 2016, Moye was arrested for disrupting a North Charleston City Council committee meeting while petitioning for a citizens board to review police actions. The city later formed the Citizens Advisory Commission on Community-Police Relations. Moye was called a hero for things he did but he demurred and observed of protest tactics “much more action, a lot less social media talking and organizing on social media. A lot less getting together at marches and yelling at inanimate objects, and a lot more action and interrupting.”

A Bree Newsome speaking engagement was set in early February 2017 and drew protestors and counter protestors. In the situation before the leap with the Confederate oversized battle flag waving, he said "And I looked at our elders and I saw, like, fear in their eyes. And I saw them back up, almost. That was the moment for me. We're not going to pass this on another generation. Not another generation of people are going to be intimidated by this flag." Moye spoke afterwards about it saying "We have been able to experience this kind of oppression and this intimidation because we don't resist it.… And we learn how to tolerate it and we learn how to normalize it. That's what my impetus was to take down that flag" in an interview with MTV News. Both the flag waving protestor and Moye were then in a fundraising situation - the protestor's efforts had stagnated but then rose to $4,000 while Moye's raised $10,000. David Meyer Lindenberg was less impressed with the leap and wrote to suppress the fundraising for Moye.

In March 2017, following his leap for justice, a concert was arranged in Charleston, "a community festival and multicultural celebration of music, art, food, activism, and community,"

Jelani Cobb, Professor of Journalism at Columbia University, writing for the New Yorker, called him "a complex, vexing, and, to his opponents and to some portion of his admirers, an exasperating figure. He was not, however, insincere, lacking insight, or, as had been apparent to me since that afternoon in the Circular Congregation Church, easily forgettable." Cobb encountered Moye during the taping of the PBS special America after Charleston with Gwen Ifill at which he appeared. Cobb's view was that Ifill did not like Moye's participation from the audience.

In April 2017 the Charleston City Paper asked Moye's advice on community organizing:

1. "don't prescribe unless you can describe"
2. "build out of our needs"
3. "Organizing friend networks and leveraging social media connections"
4. "…we don't need more people to raise awareness. We need more people to start working on actually developing solutions and organizing our presence within spaces where decisions are made."
5. "we want to have organizing that centers natives"
6. " The centering of women's voices is absolutely critical."
7. "Where you live and the neighborhood association and what's happening in your geographic location, in your neighborhood school, those are the spaces that we need a lot more organizing happening."
8. "community communication across front lines"
9. "create platforms that are collaborative"
10. "We want to express in physical reality then we want to bring that expression back into virtual reality to reflect on and to have that generate some more energy so we can express it in physical reality. There is a dance there that we're learning how to do …"
11. "paying young people" (to canvass, engage)

== Biography ==
Moye was born in Poughkeepsie, New York. At age 13, he moved to Hollywood, South Carolina. He attended University of South Carolina as a freshman in 2005 where he met Justin Bamberg, who became a lawyer and state lawmaker. Bamberg was the attorney for Scott's family after the shooting.

In a case of arson, in June 2006 Moye was one of the victims in the house who suffered severe burns.

Moye graduated from Winthrop University with a Masters of Arts degree in May 2011 and then went on to the Occupy Eugene event in October.

His experience with the fire was called a near death experience, and later found the Baháʼí Faith in South Carolina, the second largest religion there. His mother is also a follower of the Baháʼí Faith but his father was a Nation of Islam Muslim. Moye picked up the Twitter handle @daBlockUp under the name "Muhiyidin d'Baha" in 2014 and it currently features the Baháʼí ringstone symbol. During the 2014 Ferguson unrest, Moye also encouraged Cori Bush to run for state government.

In a recorded short talk he speaks of "oneness of humankind, equality of men and women, the togetherness of religion and science that just click in a way that's - oh - this is an integrated reality" and why he "embodied" himself as a Baháʼí; he said: "Baháʼu'lláh has given me the freedom to consort and be friendly with anybody of any religion of any race from anywhere on this planet because I know the oneness of human kind is a reality."

In December 2016 Moye appeared as part of a panel at the College of Charleston about the death of Walter Scott. The coverage of the death of Scott including mention of Moye won the Charleston Post and Courier a Pulitzer in breaking news.

=== Death and memorialization ===
In February 2018, Moye took a personal trip to New Orleans, Louisiana. At around 1:30am on February 6, 2018, while riding his bike along Bienville Street in the Iberville Projects, Moye was approached by a stranger, knocked off his bike, and shot in the thigh. Moye was rushed to the hospital where he later died of his injuries.

A prayer vigil was held at North Charleston City Hall on February 7 with members of his family.

A community memorial service was held on February 10, 2018, by the Denmark Vesey monument also attended by city leaders. A friend said that though he was known for some of his efforts "his real work was in the community, especially with children" and invited people to Moye's "dablockup" program of action in the community while others renamed a project for an academy in development as the "Muhiyidin d'Baha Leadership Academy". Further events were announced for February 14 at Charity Missionary Baptist Church and a funeral at the Royal Missionary Baptist Church for February 15, as well as a traditional African ceremony at McLeod Plantation February 17.

The death inspired a review of the hard life of activists and their generally early deaths by a writer in the New York Times. In June a project for a youth academy was advancing in Charleston, SC.

There was widespread public speculation that Moye's killing was related to his career as a Black Lives Matter activist (though this has been proven to not be the case). Former State Senator for the Charleston area Robert Ford made a plea on his Facebook page to call to investigate the murder, saying: “As you are aware, one of our most successful activist in the Black Lives Matter Movement, Muhiyidin Elamin Moye, has been killed. He was shot at night in New Orleans, Louisiana on Tuesday, February 6, 2018. This MUST be a call to arms as Moye was contacted to help organize the Black Lives Movement in New Orleans and this seems to be a Civil Rights Action that should be further investigated by the United States Justice Department.” Divisive comments in social media have been noted in the Fairfield Mirror student newspaper associated with Fairfield University in Connecticut.

On July 25, 2018, New Orleans police arrested Roosevelt Iglus and charged him with second-degree murder after being led to him by a tip. Iglus was on parole related to a case from 2016 to which he had pled guilty. On July 22, 2019, Iglus pled guilty to manslaughter in a plea agreement that saw him sentenced to 17 years in prison for the killing. No motive for the crime was ever suggested or confirmed by Iglus, though police believe that Iglus did not know Moye, and thought him to be someone else whom Iglus wished to harm.

In April 2020 art on Moye was included in an exhibition entitled Resilient by Chris “Kolpeace” Johnson at the Avery Research Center for African American History and Culture in Charleston, South Carolina.

== Further research ==
- Alfred J. Cotton III (2016). Do black lives matter in American mainstream news media? Two case studies of police-involved shootings of black men explaining a racist media environment (PhD). College Communication and Information, University of Kentucky.
- Muhiyyidin D'Baha, Calvin Logan (October 31, 2016). Muhiyyidin D'Baha Black Lives Matter Charleston (Television). The Logan Power Show.
