= Armstrong High School =

Armstrong High School may refer to:

== In the United States ==
- Armstrong High School (Illinois) Armstrong, Illinois
- Armstrong High School (Washington, D.C.)
- Armstrong Manual Training School Washington, D.C.
- Robbinsdale Armstrong High School, Plymouth, Minnesota
- Armstrong High School (Virginia), Richmond, Virginia
- Armstrong High School (Wisconsin), the former name of Neenah High School in Neenah, Wisconsin
