= Brenda Ray Moryck =

American writer

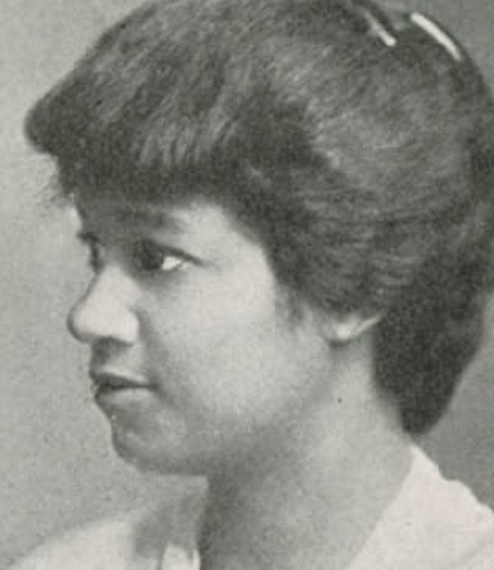
- Brenda Ray Moryck, from the 1916 Wellesley College yearbook
- Born: June 13, 1892; Newark, New Jersey, US
- Died: December 6, 1945; Stockbridge, Massachusetts
- Other name: Brenda Moryck Francke (after 1930)
- Occupations: Writer, teacher

Brenda (Estelle) Ray Moryck (June 13, 1892 – December 6, 1945) was an American writer associated with the Harlem Renaissance.

== Early life and education ==
Brenda Ray Moryck was born in Newark, New Jersey in 1892, the daughter of John W. Moryck and Sarah Rose Ray Moryck. Her father owned a saloon and her mother was an educator and clubwoman. Though Brenda wrote that her great-grandfather was Charles Bennet Ray, her mother's death record gives Adam Ray and Sarah Closson as Brenda's maternal grandparents. Multiple records for Adam Ray state that his father was Adam Ray Sr., not Charles Ray.

William Ashby wrote, "John Moryck [had] a saloon on Academy Street. He lived on Kearney Street. Moryck had an unusual daughter, Brenda. She graduated from Barringer High School, and won a scholarship at Wellsley College, certainly the first Negro girl from Newark to attend a prestigious white school."

Moryck completed a bachelor's degree from Wellesley College in 1916, the only black graduate in her class. She earned a master's degree in English literature from Howard University in 1926. Moryck was a member of Alpha Kappa Alpha sorority and was active in the Tau Omega chapter.

== Career ==
Moryck worked for the Newark Bureau of Charities after college, and taught physical culture at a technical school in Bordentown. She taught English and drama at Armstrong Manual Training School in Washington, D.C. during the 1920s. She wrote essays and stories published in The Crisis, Opportunity, and other national periodicals and newspapers. She was also a drama critic for the New York Age, and wrote at least one play, The Christmas Spirit, performed at Armstrong high school in 1927. She was active in the National Urban League, the Harlem YWCA, and the NAACP in New York. She was also an avid golfer.

Moryck's writings are associated with the Harlem Renaissance and have been included in several recent anthologies, among them The new Negro: Readings on race, representation, and African American culture, 1892-1938 (2007), edited by Henry Louis Gates Jr. and Gene Andrew Garrett, Double-take: A revisionist Harlem Renaissance anthology (2001), edited by Venetria K. Patton and Maureen Honey, Harlem's Glory: Black women writing, 1900-1950 (1996), edited by Lorraine Elena Roses and Ruth Elizabeth Randolph, and Speech & power: The African-American essay and its cultural content, from polemics to pulpit (1992). edited by Gerald Early. She had an unpublished novel in manuscript at the time of her death.

== Personal life ==
Moryck married twice. Her first husband was Lucius Lee Jordan; they married in 1917 and he died before their first anniversary. She married Robert Beale Francke in 1930. She had a daughter, Elizabeth (Betty) Osborne Francke, and a foster daughter, Julia Wormley. She died in 1945, in Massachusetts. She had been scheduled to meet up with her daughter who was in boarding school in Albany, New York.
