= Garnet C. Wilkinson =

American educator

- Born: January 10, 1879; Summerville, South Carolina, United States
- Died: June 15, 1969 (aged 90); Washington, DC, United States
- Education: Oberlin College (1902); Howard University (Bachelor of Laws, 1908)
- Occupations: Educator and School Administrator
- Spouse(s): Blanche E. Colder (married 1905); Caroline Manns (married 1948)

Garnet Crummell Wilkinson (January 10, 1879 – June 15, 1969) was an American educator best known for running the African-American public school system in Washington, DC during segregation. During this time Washington, DC had the reputation of having the best public schools in the nation for African Americans. Wilkinson enjoyed a nearly 50-year career in Washington's public schools and served as assistant superintendent for 30 years. He also favored "separate, but equal" schooling.

== Biography ==
Garnet Wilkinson was born on January 10, 1879, in Summerville, South Carolina. He was the fourth child of James W. Wilkinson, a farmer and his wife, Grace. The family relocated to Washington, D.C. in 1888, first settling in the Barry Farm neighborhood, where Wilkinson attended Birney Elementary School. His family then moved to LeDroit Park, in Washington's Northwest quadrant where activist Mary Church Terrell and, subsequently, NAACP attorney Charles Hamilton Houston. Wilkinson attended and graduated from M Street High School in 1898 and from Oberlin College in 1902. After graduating with his undergraduate degree, he returned to Washington as a Latin and economics instructor at the M Street School, teaching there for the next ten years. On May 26, 1908, Wilkinson earned an LLB from Howard University Law School and later went on to earn his master's degree from the University of Pennsylvania. He also earned an honorary doctorate from Morgan College (now Morgan State University.)

Wilkinson then served as principal of the Armstrong Manual Training School from 1913 until 1916, which was followed by his appointment as principal of Dunbar High School (formerly known as M Street School) in Washington, DC. He held this position he held until 1921, after replacing Roscoe Conklin Bruce, who resigned after a pornography scandal at M Street. In 1924, he became the assistant superintendent in charge of the colored schools in Washington, DC. Wilkinson served in that capacity until 1951, which his when he resigned.

In 1904, Wilkinson was involved in a scandal that led to his arrest. A woman named Eleanor Cartwright accused him of borrowing money during his college days, but never returning it. According to Cartwright, when she approached him for repayment, he brandished a knife and cut her throat. These allegations resulted in Wilkinson's arraignment in the District Police Court. He denied the charges, and the case was dismissed for lack of evidence.

In 1905, Wilkinson married Philadelphia native and fellow educator, Blanche E. Colder, who previously graduated from Miner Normal School. The couple never had children, but remained married for 37 years until Colder died in 1942 of illness. In 1947, Wilkinson remarried another educator, Caroline B. Mann's. Their marriage lasted until Wilkinson's death in 1969.

Wilkinson lived in the LeDroit Park section of Washington, DC and was an honorary member of Omega Psi Phi fraternity. Two of the Fraternity's founders, Oscar J. Cooper and Frank Coleman, had been students of his at the M Street School. He also participated in a range of social groups, including the Mu-So-Lit CLub, an exclusive social club for black men and the Bethel Literary and Historical Society. He helped found the Northwest Settlement House and served as chairman for the all-black 12th Street YMCA. Wilkinson also served as treasurer for the Washington NAACP for 15 years, and he was the founding president of the Washington Urban League (established in 1938) for 15 years. He helped organize the all-black Federation of Parent-Teachers Associations and served two terms as the president of the American Teachers' Association. He joined the Association for the Study of Negro Life and History under its founder, Carter G. Woodson, and served as treasurer for the Association of Negro Folk Education, which published materials related to black American culture.

Wilkinson died on June 15, 1969, at the age of ninety.

== Legacy ==
During his tenure as assistant superintendent, Wilkinson was both beloved by those who regarded him as a visionary in the area of black education and condemned by those who accused him of being a "staunch defender of the status quo." As assistant superintendent, he helped to grow Washington's reputation as a center for black educational excellence. He spearheaded initiatives to expand vocational education and athletics. He also promoted the idea of specialized schools. He enhanced the nursing program at Margaret Murray Washington High School, which trained African American girls to help meet the needs of black residents whose medical was limited to segregated hospitals. In 1928, he helped found Francis L. Cardozo High School, which served as the only segregated high school in the nation to offer a business curriculum for black students. He also promoted experiential learning and character education.

Wilkinson was also a proponent of "separate, but equal" education because he believed that it benefitted African American residents in Washington especially. This position placed him at odds with many local anti-segregation activists, as well as the NAACP, which was gearing up to fight segregation in the courts. During a protest in 1947, when black parents staged a boycott over the inferior resources of several schools, including Browne Junior High School, Wilkinson opposed the strike. He also opposed the transfer of the illustrious all-white Central High School to black students who had been attending Cardozo High School, which was dangerously overcrowded. Later, Additionally, he supported a school board ban on the NAACP's publication The Crisis and the Urban League's Opportunity Magazine. When asked to reconcile his support of the ban and his connection to the NAACP and the Urban League, Wilkinson responded, "If I have to choose between the two, I would have to drop my connection with the organization[s]." When the school board disinvited noted author and activist Pearl S. Buck from giving a speech at Cardozo High School in 1951, Wilkinson argued that Buck's radicalism posed a threat. Many African American residents, most especially black parents, regarded his behavior as abominable.

In 1978, the DC Public Library opened up a wing in Wilkinson Elementary School (Now Moten Elementary School) called the Garnet C. Wilkinson Branch.
