= Cards for Hospitalized Kids =

US nonprofit organization

- Founded: 2011
- Founder: Jen Rubino
- Purpose: Hospitalized and seriously ill children and adolescents
- Location: Chicago, Illinois, US
- Website: www.cardsforhospitalizedkids.com

Cards for Hospitalized Kids is an American national charitable organization based in Chicago that was founded in March 2011 by Jen Rubino. Its mission is to provide hospitalized children with hope and joy through handmade cards. Over 500,000 kids have received cards from the organization since its inception.

Individuals and groups across the United States, and abroad, make handmade cards and sending them to Cards for Hospitalized Kids for distribution in hospitals. The organization has received support from celebrities such as Lauren Conrad, Nastia Liukin, and Aly Raisman, who send in cards and autographed pictures to be distributed in hospitals. Individuals and organizations also become involved with Cards for Hospitalized Kids by hosting their own card-making events. IndyCar racer Graham Rahal and his foundation hosted their own card-making event for Cards for Hospitalized Kids in May 2012. Dolphin trainers at Sea World San Diego hosted a card-making event in December 2011. As a result of this national support, thousands of children at more than 150 hospitals and Ronald McDonald Houses nationwide have received cards. Cards are delivered to hospitals monthly. In 2013, Cards for Hospitalized Kids began to receive international support, with cards arriving from other countries such as Japan, Australia, and Israel.

Cards for Hospitalized Kids has utilized social media to spread the word through their Facebook and Twitter accounts, which has helped them gain support from people around the world. Tweets from MTV Star Lauren Conrad resulted in nearly 500 additional Twitter followers for them.

Cards for Hospitalized Kids has been featured in publications including International Gymnast Magazine, the Sun Times, the TribLocal, Teen Voices Magazine, and MTV Act. Founder Jen Rubino has blogged about Cards for Hospitalized Kids and her own experience in the hospital for the Huffington Post. The group also maintains a website.

Cards for Hospitalized Kids and its founder, Jen Rubino, have received multiple honors and awards for their service. In November 2012, Rubino received the Daily Point of Light Award. The award was created by President George H. W. Bush to "honor individuals and groups creating meaningful change in communities across America". To this day, President Bush continues to sign all of the awards. In June 2013, Rubino was awarded the Prudential Spirit of Community Award from Prudential Financial. The Illinois House of Representatives recognized Cards for Hospitalized Kids and Rubino in a resolution in which they detailed some of the organization's accomplishments and expressed congratulations to Rubino on receiving the Prudential Spirit of Community award.
