= Rufus P. Turner =

American academic, engineer and author

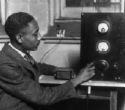
- Turner working on an early radio
- Born: December 25, 1907; Houston, Texas
- Died: March 25, 1982 (aged 74)
- Education: Armstrong Tech; California State University, Los Angeles (BA, 1958); University of Southern California (MA, 1960; PhD, 1966)
- Known for: Transistor radios; popular and technical electronics texts

Rufus Paul Turner (December 25, 1907 – March 25, 1982) was an academic, engineer, and author who published on semiconductor devices, technical writing style, and poet-novelist Charlotte Smith. After three decades working with electronic devices – including developing the first practical transistor radio – he earned a doctorate in literature at age 52 and became an English professor. He wrote over 40 books and 3000 articles during his six-decade career.

== Biography ==
Born in 1907 in Houston, Texas, Turner began working with crystal diodes at age 15 and published his first article on radio electronics at age 17. He attended Armstrong Tech in Washington, D.C. In 1925, still a teenager, he built what was then the world's smallest radio set, and was awarded the second commercial radio operator's license in the third district. His station, W3LF, was "the first radio station licensed to a black broadcaster in the U.S." By 1928, he operated W3LF as a 15-watt station on Franklin Street NW in Washington, D.C. He also operated a station for his neighborhood church.

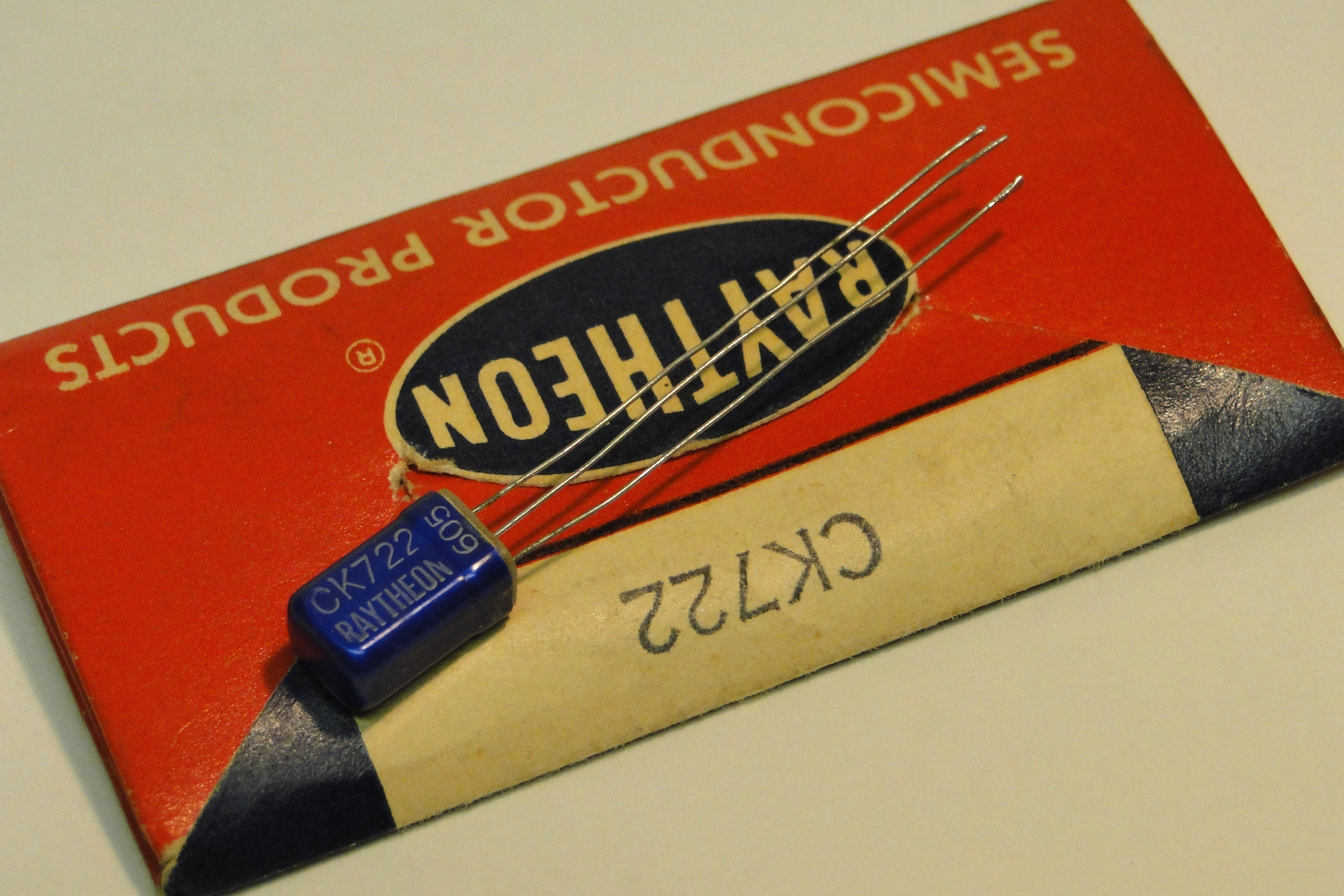
Several of Turner's early transistor radio designs used CK722 transistors (pictured)

Although he did not initially pursue a college degree, Turner's experience with electronics led him to a variety of engineering positions. He was a licensed professional engineer in California and Massachusetts. He taught electronics at a vocational school and the University of Rhode Island, and business communication at the University of Southern California.

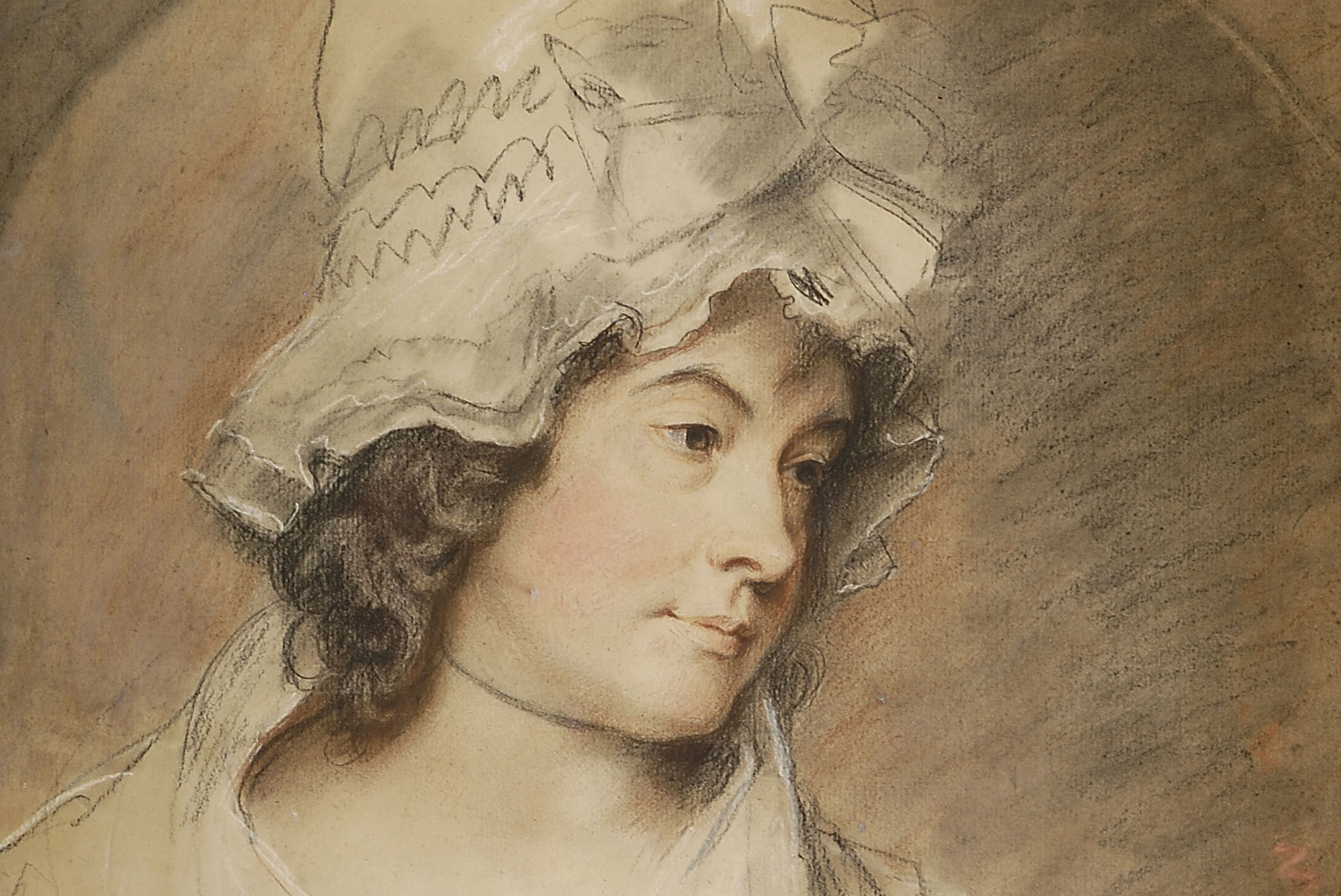
Turner's doctoral thesis focused on Charlotte Turner Smith, an 18th-century romantic writer

Turner was involved with creating the 1N34A germanium diode at Sylvania in the 1940s. He began experimenting with germanium transistors soon after their invention in 1947. In 1949, before transistors were commercially available, he published the popular article "Build a Transistor", considered a "benchmark publication" in amateur radio. In January 1950, after commercial units were released, he published "A Crystal Receiver with Transistor Amplifier" in Radio and Television News, along with plans for a three-transistor radio circuit. These plans – printed four years before the Regency TR-1 (the first commercial transistor radio) – were the first time most amateur radio operators were introduced to transistors as viable radio components. He continued development of his pocket-size radios as superior transistors became available, culminating in the 'widely read' "Transistor Portable with a Punch", an 'ambitious' four-transistor non-superheterodyne AM radio published in Popular Electronics in 1956.

Over sixty years, Turner published a variety of electronics articles and technical books aimed at both amateurs and professionals. While many early publications on semiconductors focused on theory, his were largely application-based. His semiconductor work included practical guides to components like integrated circuits, solar cells, zener diodes, varactors, thermistors, varistors, and field-effect transistors. He also wrote on technical writing, electronics testing and oscilloscopes, impedance, oscillators, and hobbyist electronics projects, and authored an elementary calculus textbook.

Although his work was primarily in electronics, Turner had varied interests and decided in the mid 1950s to turn his attention to literature. He earned his BA from California State College at Los Angeles in 1958 and his MA in English from the University of Southern California in 1960. He was hired in 1960 as an English professor at CSC. His 1966 thesis at U.S.C. for his PhD analyzed the life and writings of Charlotte Turner Smith. Turner taught at California State College until 1973, but continued to publish in electronics. He died in March 1982.
