= Friendship Armstrong Academy =

NRHP-listed high school in Washington, D.C.

- Armstrong Manual Training School
- U.S. National Register of Historic Places
- D.C. Inventory of Historic Sites
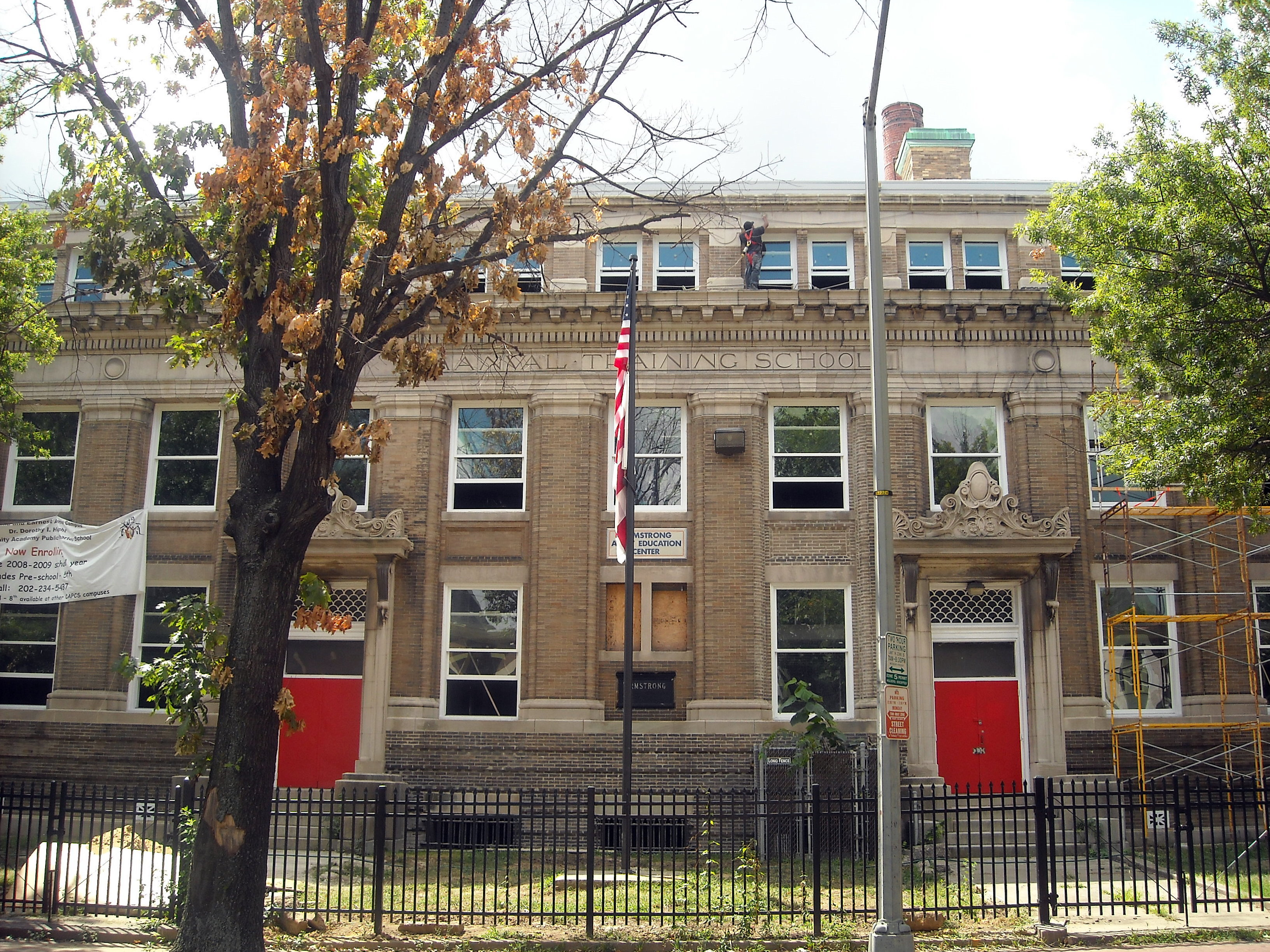

- Location within Central Washington, D.C.
- Location: 1400 First St., NW; Washington, D.C.
- Coordinates: 38°54′32″N 77°0′49″W
- Area: less than one acre
- Built: 1902
- Architect: Waddy B. Wood
- Architectural style: Renaissance Revival
- NRHP reference No.: 96000893

Significant dates
- Added to NRHP: August 16, 1996
- Designated DCIHS: May 23, 1996

Friendship Armstrong Academy is a public charter school located in the Truxton Circle neighborhood of Washington, D.C. Historically a black school, it is housed in the former Armstrong Manual Training School, also known as the Samuel Chapman Armstrong Technical High School.

== History ==
The school's original site contained 36,952 square feet and was purchased at a cost of $15,187.50. With the passage of an act of the 55th Congress, approved March 3, 1899, the school first bore the name Manual Training School No. 2, later changed to Armstrong Manual Training School.

Designed for African-American students, it was one of the city's two segregated manual training schools, the other one being William McKinley Manual Training School (Manual Training School No. 1) for white students. It was named in honor of Union brevet Brigadier General Samuel C. Armstrong who became an educator. On October 24, 1902, Dr. Booker T. Washington made the principal address at the dedication ceremony. The school is located on P Street, between First and Third Streets, Northwest. In 1918, the school was used as a hospital for African-American influenza patients.

The Armstrong High Annex was dedicated on April 24, 1927. Chief Justice Walter I. McCoy of the District Supreme Court presided at the formal dedication. Proctor L. Dougherty, president of the board of District Commissioners made the presentation on behalf of the Commissioners. Addresses of acceptance were made by Charles F. Carusi, president of the Board of Education; Dr. Frank W. Ballou, Superintendent of Schools, and Garnet C. Wilkinson, Assistant Superintendent. Professor Dwight O. W. Holmes, dean of the college of education, Howard University, delivered an address on "The Citizenry and The Schools.

Armstrong High School discontinued operating as a high school in 1958. The building served as Veterans High School, between 1958 and 1964. In 1964, it has served as the Armstrong Adult Education Center. The D.C. Board of Education closed the school in 1996. The Dorothy Height Charter School operated in the building until its charter was revoked in 2015.

The building was placed on the National Register of Historic Places in 1996. It is currently functioning as an elementary public charter school under the name Friendship Armstrong Academy.

== Architecture ==
The design of the school was selected by competition. A circular letter dated July 22, 1899 was sent to a large number of well known Washington architectural firms inviting them to participate. Of the fourteen designs received, the one provided by local architect, Waddy B. Wood, was selected. Arthur Cowsill was the builder overseeing the construction of the building that commenced in 1900 and was completed in 1902. The building and site cost $140,000 and the equipment, $38,800, making a total of $178,800.

The original section of the building was designed generally in the Renaissance Revival style with a symmetrical facade plan of a central projecting pavilion flanked by two recessed sections. Well-placed classical details, such as the dentiled cornice, the elaborate pediments over the two main doors, and the cartouche at the corner pilasters, provide a sense of monumentality to the building. These elaborated main exterior materials were yellow brick. The exterior trim materials were limestone. The windows were 1 over 1 light sash with flat arches on both floors. The lintels and sills were made from limestone. In the central pavilion, the windows were separated by ionic pilasters that extended the height of the two main floors, giving a colonnaded effect to the facade. The door surround was composed of limestone with an unusual carved limestone pediment supported with carved foliated consoles. The roof is flat. A bracketed cornice built of limestone marks the top of the original section.The granite stairs rise from the sidewalk level to the first floor. The transom above the door is elaborated with fish scale detail. The girls' entrance and a boys' entrance were placed under the fourth window from either end of the central pavilion. The recessed areas on either side of the central pavilion contained four windows.

The power plant consisted of two 50 horse-power engines and dynamos, two 70 horse-power boilers, generating light, heat and power. The entire building was lit by electricity. There were classrooms for academic work, four laboratories, arrangements for experiments in physics and chemistry and material for serving and cooking. There were four shops for machine work, wood-turning, carpentry, etc., where a thorough course in practical mechanics was given.

During the 1910s and 1920s, the D.C. Commissioners acquired land adjacent to the school. An annex was constructed on the south side of the school between 1924 and 1927. The later additions, including the third floor and the adjoining annex, were designed to harmonize with the original section.

== Academic and technical curriculum ==
Curriculum was designed according to the educational philosophies of Samuel C. Armstrong and Booker T. Washington. It provided training for black students in a range of trades based on the belief that "all forms of labor, whether with head or hand are honorable."

Twenty-four instructors constituted the original teaching corps. The enrollment was 342 children, with seats for only 303. To relieve the pressure, however, the Board of Education recommended an additional building, with increased seating and shop facilities, asking for an additional appropriation of $65,000 for the same and also, that the salary of the principal be raised from $1,600 to $2,000 per annum.

With the expansion of the school, the course offerings included both academic and technical subjects. The Annex was designed to recognize the practicability of technical high schools which would enable those who did not continue formal education beyond the high school period to embark upon life equipped with the knowledge of trade.

== Notable people ==
=== Principals ===
- Wilson Bruce Evans, 1902–1912
- Garnet C. Wilkinson, 1915–1916
- Carter G. Woodson, 1917–1918
- Benetta B. Washington
- Francis A. Gregory
- Lashawn Brown
- Jeffery Scanlon
- Dr. Joseph Webb

=== Faculty and alumni ===
- Jimmy Cobb
- Ford Dabney, ragtime pianist, composer, jazz band leader
- Billy Eckstine, musician
- Duke Ellington, 1913–1917, composer and pianist
- Lillian Evanti, opera singer
- Len Ford, Pro Football Hall of Fame inductee
- Rick Henderson
- Osie Johnson
- Bill Kenny
- John Malachi, jazz pianist
- Bubba Morton
- Brenda Ray Moryck
- Nathaniel Allison Murray, faculty, co-founder of Alpha Phi Alpha
- Hubert B. Pair
- Charlie Rouse
- Billy Stewart
- Alma Thomas, artist
- Decatur Trotter
- Samuel Wilbert Tucker
- Rufus P. Turner
- Chancellor Williams
- John A. Wilson.
- Willie Wood, Hall of Fame NFL Safety

== See also ==
- National Register of Historic Places listings in the District of Columbia
