= Baháʼí radio =

Several radio stations worldwide, established by the international Baháʼí community

Since 1977, the international community of the Baháʼí Faith has established several radio stations worldwide, particularly in the Americas. Programmes may include local news, music, topics related to socio-economic and community development, educational programmes focusing on indigenous language and culture, and Baháʼí introductory and deepening material.

== History ==
Since the 1960s there has been interest in mass media to promote and support development projects. This was followed by a view that the service of the community was through the participation of the community and spread of information. A series of UNESCO conferences lead to advancing the issues until in 1978 a conference was held in Ecuador. At that conference researchers summarized developments along these lines and noted challenges such projects faced and a few ways such projects failed while also noting that village radio stations seemed to be a nice fit because of the necessary quality of communication in a society. The Baháʼí Radio project in Ecuador served as a means to study the process of the two trends by setting up a community radio station of the community for the community - and may have been the first such project in all Latin America aimed at serving the campesinos as its primary purpose with development oriented programming. It mixed national music forms with public service features (lost and found, messages to individuals, official communications, but looking to develop more.) The project was studied through faculty from Northwestern University from 1980 to 1982, and briefly in 1983, and reviewed Baháʼí Radio projects in Peru and Bolivia as well and resulted in a PhD by Kurt John Hein in 1985 following which he took up service at WLGI Radio Baháʼí.

=== Ecuador ===
Baháʼí Radio in Ecuador evolved as a way to serve the thousands of converts in the late 1960s and 1970s. A native of Otavalo, Ecuador, and chairman of the National Spiritual Assembly investigated using radio as a tool for spreading the religion and serving the newly forming communities. In early 1973 Raul Pavon leased Radio Turismo station and initiated fourteen hours of daily broadcasts. None involved had backgrounding in running a radio station. Initial success was based on playing local and national music genre. However the lease was rescinded and Baháʼí programing was limited to 2 hrs a day while the successful aspect of the programming was carried on. In July 1973 the national assembly added the goal of a radio station to its budget and a committee to create programing. Programming was developed and aired in eight cities between 15 minute segments up to hour-long bilingual (Spanish-Quichua) programs of Baháʼí prayers, and drawing from Baháʼí literature as well as information of its world-wide community. In 1975 training workshops were organized for scriptwriters. Other trainings continued in 1976. By 1976 the committee had produced 1286 hours of programming at a cost of approximately $2000 as well as documentation to support sister projects. Meanwhile, progress in getting a radio station began in 1975 when the aim was develop a short-wave radio station to serve all of Ecuador. The government lost the first submission for a license and the second was rejected. In 1976 revised the request by asking for a low-power AM radio station which was finally granted in 1977 – noting that the government imposed a requirement that the station had to be ready for testing in 90 days from the beginning of construction - the final date to be up and broadcasting turned out to be October 27. Land was bought, a generator put in place, construction of buildings and equipment was gathered or fabricated on the spot. With voluntary services the antenna was raised at a cost of about $900. HCRN-1, Radio Baháʼí del Ecuador, 1420 kHz, did their first test transmission on October 12 with 20 watts of power. Full-time programming (6 hrs/day) began December 12. There were challenges of coordination and staffing to overcome. Outside trainers or professional staff were able to come in 1977, 1978, and 1980. A Commission was developed typically including a body composed of an indigenous person, a "white" person, technical experts, senior Baháʼís and a veteran of the station, with a balance of majority of local people while also one member to be literate and capable of dealing with the administration of the commission.

It wasn't until 1981 that a suitable director was able to take up service by combining the qualities of being a Baháʼí, an experienced radio professional, and an Ecuadoran and able to volunteer. With regular feedback from experienced institutions operating out of the Baháʼí World Centre progress was maintained and Dr. David Ruhe, then a member of the Universal House of Justice visited in 1980 and acted as liaison between the radio station and the Audio-Visual Department at the Baháʼí administrative offices. In 1980 almost the entire staff traveled to Peru to make extensive presentations to the international Baháʼí media conference in Puno where the second Baháʼí Radio station would be set up. In 1981 Marcelo Quinteros was appointed as the executive director of Radio Baháʼí Ecuador after essentially rising in place while serving at the station for the prior six years. Quinteros originally became involved with the station as a younger brother of a broadcaster who had quit service at Radio Turismo after the way the Baháʼís had been broken from their lease and in addition to Quinteros six other indigenous had systematically begun to serve at the station as full-time staff as well as larger numbers of part-time staff amounting to some 200 persons including indigenous youth in the first four years of the operation of the station. Indigenous staff were able to conduct workshops for other indigenous staff, in Spanish and Quichua, for the first time in 1981. Staff for projects in Bolivia, Chile and Peru participated in successive training and Ecuadoran staff traveled to Peru and Bolivia to assist in those projects. The Commission wrote to the Chilean Baháʼís about the development of their radio station that:

The most important and indispensable thing is to maintain a happy, loving, spirited team-family. Try to have as high a percentage as possible of your staff native. At least 75%. It is far better to let a native do something wrong than not to give him the opportunity by having a foreigner do it.

By 1983 training of staff at Radio Baháʼí Ecuador was almost entirely in the hands of indigenous staff. There has also been training at the Amoz Gibson Training Center for Baháʼí Media in Puerto Rico operated by CIRBAL (Centro para Intercambio Radiofonico Baháʼí de America Latina.) About 1983 the station was operating 15hrs/day on AM and 4 hrs per day on short-wave and was the dominant cost of the National Spiritual Assembly of Ecuador even though most of its staff are volunteers who receive only a small stipend. Office are in Otavalo and linked with the broadcast cite by microwave links. In addition to offices and studios the main cite houses a community garden plot, and a chosas style building as its meeting hall and hosts regional conferences as well. The main AM broadcast has evolved to 1 kilowatt at 1240 kHz in 1983. The second site maintained for the station is its short-wave broadcast facilities near El Cajas. A furniture store run by non-Baháʼís acts as the Cayambe regional offices for locals to drop off news and requests for airing on the station.

The basic programming pattern was 80% local or national music favored by the indigenous population and 20% talking. The music portion presented songs reviewed for content: aimed for the campesinos or not, appropriate for the time played, dignified, harmonious one song to the next, popularity, and explicitly incorporating new releases. Programming changes included discontinuing music viewed as raucous. Instead the station broadcast messages inviting local musicians and groups to be recorded. In less than one year 30 or 40 such groups came forward however the majority of songs were devoted to drinking and infidelity. Instead music gathered from the wider region, and from music festivals, was emphasized. Younger "white" youth working at the station wanted to incorporate pop music. Instead a process of moods was emphasized – after morning prayers the music selections were a little sad or sentimental to create a meditative mood, then happy music to inspire people to leave for work upbeat, then in the afternoon music reflecting on family, nostalgia for the home. Initially the talking programming was simple recitation of the Baháʼí literature but by 1981 talking programming included coverage of development projects elsewhere Since its inception the religion has had involvement in socio-economic development beginning by giving greater freedom to women, promulgating the promotion of female education as a priority concern, and that involvement was given practical expression by creating schools, agricultural coops, and clinics. The religion entered a new phase of activity when a message of the Universal House of Justice dated 20 October 1983 was released. Baháʼís were urged to seek out ways, compatible with the Baháʼí teachings, in which they could become involved in the social and economic development of the communities in which they lived. World-wide in 1979 there were 129 officially recognized Baháʼí socio-economic development projects. By 1987, the number of officially recognized development projects had increased to 1482. In Ecuador the talking programing began to cover news, helping society in a number of ways, and religious programming.

News programming deliberately covered only local news unless the government required coverage of particular events. Coverage avoided presenting political advertising. In 1978-9 25 reports of lost children resulted in 24 recovered children. The remaining child had been murdered and the station hosted services for the child. A wide range of organizations brought news releases to the station - associations of artisans, cooperatives, firefighters, primary and secondary schools, etc. Lost animals and livestock would be delivered to the station and wait for their owners to come. Outbreaks of diseases would be responded to with informational programming. Programming informing the citizens of the availability of assistance in getting national ID cards for illiterate overwhelmed the local office - this campaign of creating documentation was noted as one of the most successful in Ecuador.

An attempt was made to bridge the informational releases from the government and the experience of the campesinos - latrines had been dug but the campesinos felt they were too valuable to hold excrement. Through a grant from the National Spiritual Assembly of Canada and the Canadian International Development Agency staff were hired and programming developed to bring feedback from the campesinos to government ministries especially in agriculture. Using a mobile van they interviewed farmers and ministry representatives responding. Imported materials in Spanish were translated into Quichua overcoming problems of language, accent, vocabulary, and format (monologues vs dialogs.) Broader programming was developed in Quichua devoted to cultural program including folklore, festivals, crafts, child-care, nutrition, first aid, hygiene, etc.

Religious programming coverage of Nineteen Day Feasts and Holy Days. In April programs included guidance on election procedures for Baháʼí Local Spiritual Assemblies. And there were devotional and proclamation programing including historical overviews of the Baháʼí Faith.

Extended coverage of public affairs was undertaken of various kinds. At one point Otavalo was officially raised in status to a city - various organizations developed special programing for the event. Various schools produced shows, as well as the local Anthropological Institute. The formal session of the municipal council was recorded and aired. There were other events covered as well: basketball championships, new programs started at a local training school. An annual music festival started with the founding of the radio station. The first annual celebration attracted some 600 people in 1977. By 1979 2000 people attended. In 1980 the festival was extended to three days to include elimination rounds in contests between musicians. In 1981 there were six rounds elimination rounds and the rounds were then decimated to the area villages rather than at the station itself and included visiting groups from Peru, Bolivia and Chile. A children's festival was also initiated. In 1979 75 children performed in front of 1000 people. In 1982, 4000 people attended.

== Panama ==
Similar to the development in Ecuador, the Guaymi Cultural Center in Panama, for example, operates a radio station, holds annual music and dance festivals, an annual children's festival, regional women's conferences, regular consultations where Guaymi and other indigenous people can consult about their future, and other meetings. It provides training for teachers of the rural secondary curriculum and for adult literacy instructors, assists eleven village schools, and supports local Baháʼí communities in the area by disseminating information on health care, farming, and other development topics.

== Bolivia ==
Radio Baháʼí Bolivia is a service project of the National Spiritual Assembly.

== Stations ==
- HCRN-1, the Baháʼí radio station in Otavalo, Ecuador, that was started on October 12, 1977, was the first Baháʼí radio station in the world.
- The Panama Baháʼí Radio, established in 1985, is an AM broadcasting station from Boca del Monte with programs and news in Guaymí native language, Ngabere, leading to maintaining the usefulness of the language and in the telling of stories and coverage of issues to the support of Guaymí traditions and culture.
- Bolivia (1984)
- Chile (1986)
- Peru (1986)
- DZDF (1584 kHz) Baháʼí Radio is an FM station in Cabanatuan, Philippines.
- WLGI, known as "Radio Baháʼí", is licensed to Hemingway, South Carolina, United States, and broadcasts at 90.9 FM.

There are also various internet radio programs run by Baháʼís.

- Frequency 19 is a French language Baháʼí radio.
- Bahairadio is a Persian language Internet broadcast.
- Radio YekJahan: A Persian language radio broadcast.

== See also ==
- Socio-economic development (Baháʼí)
- Baháʼí Faith and Native Americans
