= Bethel Literary and Historical Society =

The Bethel Literary and Historical Society was an organization founded in 1881 by African Methodist Episcopal Church Bishop Daniel Payne and continued at least until 1915. It represented a highly significant development in African-American society in Washington, D.C. Most of its early members were members of the Metropolitan AME Church where its meetings were held, while maintaining an open invitation for black Washingtonians from across the city. It immediately developed into the preeminent debating society and forum for racial issues in Washington, D.C. The prospect of a separation of schools for black children was heatedly debated in 1881–82 as were the ideas of Booker T. Washington and W. E. B. Du Bois in 1903. It was one of the stops of ʻAbdu'l-Bahá's journeys to the West.

The society's presentations attracted a wide swath of speakers: Frederick Douglass ("The Philosophy and History of Reform"), Mary Ann Shadd ("Heroes of the Anti-Slavery Struggles"), Mary Church Terrell ("A Glimpse of Europe"), Belva Ann Lockwood ("Is Marriage a Failure?"), John Mercer Langston ("The Emancipated Races of Latin America"), Kelly Miller ("Higher Education"), Ida B. Wells ("Southern Outrages"), Archibald Grimké ("Modern Industrialism and the Negro in the United States").

== Presidents ==
While several records of the organization are not preserved, among the presidents of the society listed in various sources are:

- Robert J. Smith (1885, First president)
- Rev. James Dean (succeeded Smith)
- Joseph H. Douglass (succeeded Dean)
- John Wesley Cromwell (succeeded Douglass)
- James Storum (succeeded Cromwell)
- George M. Arnold (succeeded Storum)
- Mary Church Terrell (1892, its first woman president succeeded Arnold)
- J. K. Rector (succeeded Terrell)
- R. S. Smith (succeeded Rector)
- A. E. Clark (1895 immediately preceded Hershaw, succeeded Smith.)
- Lafayette M. Hershaw (1897)
- William H. Richards (1899)
- Frank Lewis Cardozo (1901)
- Kelly Miller
- George W Jackson
- Shelby J. Davidson (1906)
- Marie A. D. Madra (1907)
- Louis George Gregory (1909)
- Garnet C. Wilkinson (1910)

In various references it is also called Bethel Historical and Literary Society, Bethel Literary. There were also sister organizations with the same name, for example in Philadelphia.
