= Sidney Park Colored Methodist Episcopal Church =

Historic church in South Carolina, United States

- U.S. National Register of Historic Places
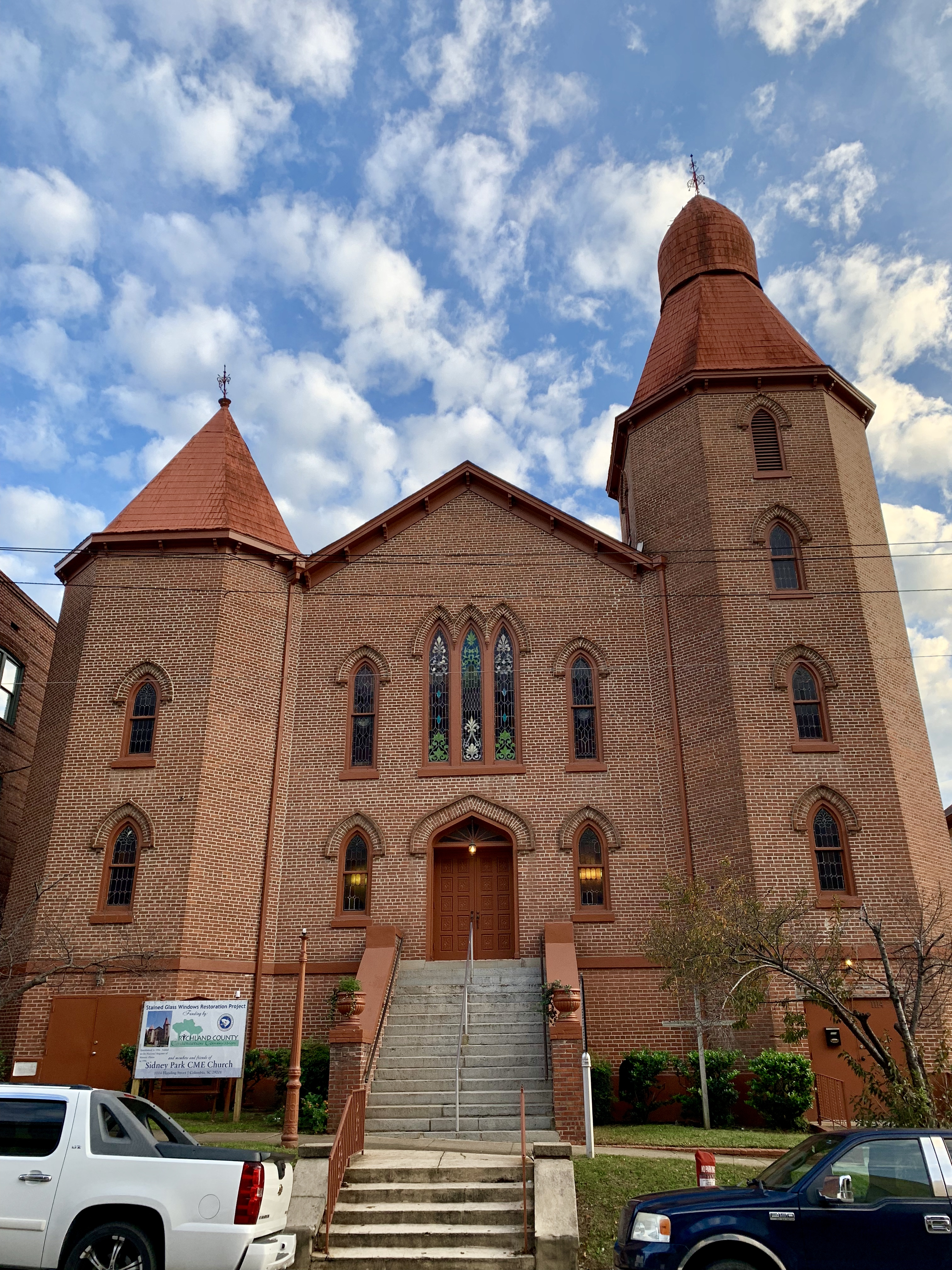

- Location within South Carolina Location within the United States
- Location: 1114 Blanding St. Columbia, South Carolina
- Coordinates: 34°0′26″N 81°2′15″W
- Area: less than one acre
- Built: 1893
- Architectural style: Late Gothic Revival
- NRHP reference No.: 96001222
- Added to NRHP: October 24, 1996

Sidney Park Colored Methodist Episcopal Church, also known as Sidney Park Christian Methodist Episcopal Church, is a historic Methodist Episcopal church located at Columbia, South Carolina. It was built in 1893, and is a brick Late Gothic Revival style church. It features the only set of octagonal towers in Columbia; each is topped by an octagonal steeple. The church also has lancet windows and pointed arches, wall buttresses, and a heavy timber truss system. The African-American congregation has a long history of involvement with civil rights activity and connection with the NAACP.

It was added to the National Register of Historic Places in 1996.
