= WLGI =

- Hemingway, South Carolina; United States
- Broadcast area: Myrtle Beach
- Frequency: 90.9 MHz
- Branding: 90.9 FM WLGI

Programming
- Format: Variety

Ownership
- Owner: National Spiritual Assembly of the Bahai' s of the United States

History
- Former call signs: WBHA (1983–1983)
- Call sign meaning: Louis Gregory Institute

Technical information
- Licensing authority: FCC
- Facility ID: 38505
- Class: C1
- ERP: 50,000 watts
- HAAT: 154.0 meters
- Transmitter coordinates: 33°43′9.00″N 79°19′50.00″W

Links
- Public license information: Public file; LMS
- Website: http://radiobahai.us

WLGI, known as "Radio Baháʼí", is licensed to Hemingway, South Carolina, and broadcasts at 90.9 FM. The station broadcasts a variety of programming, both religious and secular. The station is licensed by the FCC for noncommercial Class C1 operation and is operated by the Louis G. Gregory Baháʼí Institute, named after Hand of the Cause Louis George Gregory, a prominent African-American Baháʼí. It serves Horry, Georgetown, Williamsburg, Florence and Marion counties, in South Carolina, areas for which the station also provides announcements, partners with local organizations and agencies, and supports remote broadcasts.

See Baháʼí Faith in South Carolina.
