= Occupy Eugene =

Protest event in Eugene, Oregon, U.S.

- Part of the Occupy movement
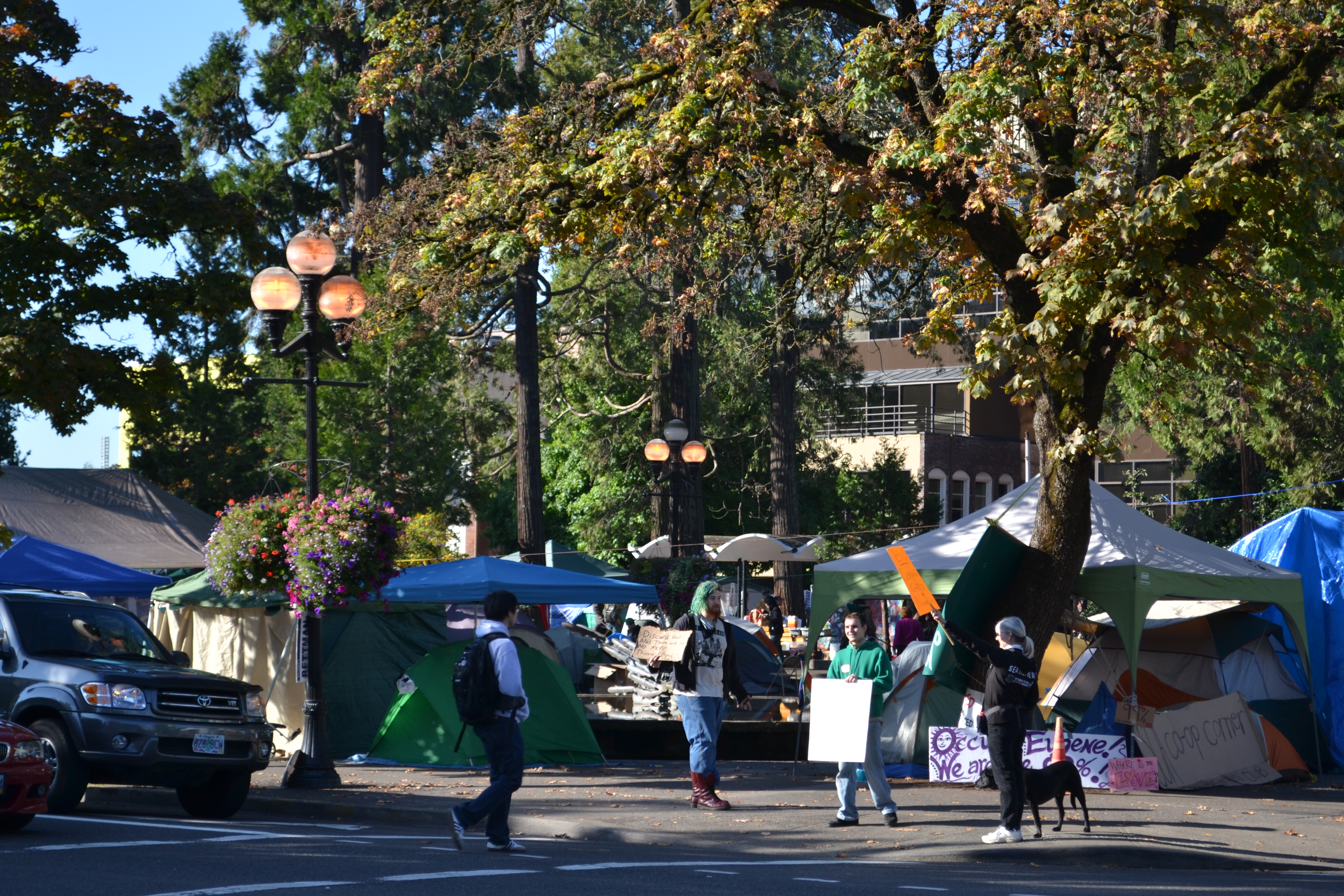
- Eighth and Oak Streets
- Date: October 2011 – December 27, 2011
- Location: Eugene, Oregon, United States, Washington Jefferson Park, as of Nov. 4, 2011
- Caused by: Economic inequality, corporate influence over government, inter alia.
- Methods: Demonstration, occupation, protest, street protesters
- Status: Defeated

Casualties and losses
- 20+ arrested, 1 death

Occupy Eugene was a collaboration that occurred in Eugene, Oregon based on the Occupy Wall Street movement which began in New York City on September 17, 2011. Occupy Eugene included peaceful protests and demonstrations. Protesters were concerned about inequities in the distribution of wealth, banking regulation, housing issues and corporate greed. The first protest march was held on October 15, 2011. The march started at the Wayne Morse Free Speech Plaza and continued downtown before marching over Ferry Street Bridge. It was reported that close to 2000 people were in attendance from all over the state of Oregon. Occupy Eugene continued to hold regular protests and actions until it left the encampment in December 2011. Protesters have stated that they do not have a set group of leaders. Occupy Eugene General Assemblies have met from as frequently as twice a day at times during active occupations, and as infrequently as weekly. Many committees have met since at least the third General Assembly, typically weekly. Decisions are made through a process known as consensus. Occupy Eugene's consensus process operates in a similar fashion to how consensus is being handled in New York City by protesters involved in Occupy Wall Street. Although the exact method varies from Occupation to Occupation. As of October 18, 2011, The Eugene police department was allowing protesters to camp in downtown Eugene, although city law prohibits it. Eugene police also stated that downtown camping won't be permanently allowed.

Until August 2013, Occupy Eugene and various spin-off groups have continued to engage in organized meetings, events and actions.

== Locations ==
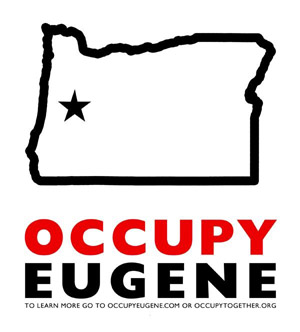
Occupy Eugene Poster

Occupy Eugene's first location was downtown in an area known as the park blocks on the corner of 8th and Oak. It began in mid October 2011.

According to a post on the Occupy Eugene Facebook page, the community was invited to march with the Occupiers to a new location after protesters conferred with Eugene's city manager and chief of police and settled upon Alton Baker Park.

On October 27, Occupy Eugene occupied the quad at the University of Oregon for half a day before moving their encampment to Riverfront Research Park, also known as Millrace Park, across Franklin Boulevard from the University, where they remained until Friday, November 4.

On November 4, Occupy Eugene relocated their camp to Washington Jefferson Park between 6th and 7th Avenues.

On December 27, the last remaining occupant left the camp at Washington Jefferson Park.

As of January 23, Occupy Eugene's newest location, known as OEV or Occupy 5 is located at a donated warehouse near downtown Eugene.

As of August 2013, Free Speech Plaza at 8th and Oak is occupied, about 40 tents and 80 people.

Occupy Eugene has an Office in the Growers Market Office, which is located at the Growers Market building on Willamette and 5th.

The movement continued with a new goal: to proliferate free and open urban communes for their own sake. At the Occupy camp, the fourth major one in Eugene since 2011, fifteen people live for free in tents on public display near downtown as of Nov. 1, 2014. They encouraged others to join, and hope to grow their movement to turn urban open spaces into communes, with or without government permission, all around the world.

== Media ==
Occupy Eugene Uses several online portals for communication, including the official site http://www.OccupyEugeneMedia.org. Several Facebook pages, The official Occupy Eugene YouTube channel, in addition to Occupy Eugene Video, Occupy Eugene Interview series an ongoing collaborative project operated by members of Occupy Eugene, Occupy Eugene Music and a theater YouTube channels that are content specific multimedia portals designed to help facilitate communication and culture.

=== Occupy TV ===
Occupy TV is a community television based project that currently runs a talk show with members of Occupy Eugene. It is currently run on Comcast Cable Channel 29 Community Television of Lane County, Eugene, Oregon. It is also available from the Occupy Eugene Video channel on YouTube.

== Death of Rick Youngblood ==
Rick Youngblood, a 51-year-old homeless man was found beaten to death and choked after having been involved in one of a number of physical altercations on December 23, 2011. His father was told Youngblood had come into camp and picked a fight and some of the members of the encampment subdued him.

After this incident, local sympathy for OccupyEugene diminished. Official tolerance of the encampment ended with the police gradually pushing the group out of the park.

== See also ==
- List of Occupy movement protest locations
