= Prudential Spirit of Community Award =

The Prudential Spirit of Community Awards program is the United States' largest youth recognition program based exclusively on volunteer community service. The program was created in 1995 by Prudential in partnership with the National Association of Secondary School Principals (NASSP) to honor middle level and high school students for outstanding service to others at the local, state, and national level.

The program's goals are to applaud young people who already are making a positive difference in their towns and neighborhoods, and to inspire others to think about how they might contribute to their communities. Over the past 16 years, more than 310,000 young Americans have participated in the program, and nearly 100,000 of them have been officially recognized for their volunteer work.

The Prudential Spirit of Community Awards program is also conducted in Japan, South Korea, Taiwan, Ireland, Brazil and India, where Prudential has significant business operations. In 2022, the Spirit of Community Awards transitioned into a new program called the Prudential Emerging Visionaries.

== Eligibility ==
Any young person who: is in grades 5-12 as of November 1 during the applying year, is a legal resident of any U.S. state or Washington, D.C., has engaged in a volunteer activity that occurred at least partly during the 12 months prior to the date of application, and submits a completed application to a school principal or the head of an officially designated local organization by November 1.

== See also ==
- List of awards for volunteerism and community service
