= Lists of holidays =

Lists of holidays by various categorizations.

== Religious holidays ==
=== Abrahamic holidays (Middle Eastern) ===
==== Christian holidays ====
- Christmas (Nativity of Jesus Christ, the beginning of Christmastide)
- Solemnity of Mary, Mother of God
- Epiphany of the Lord
- Palm Sunday (Commemoration of the triumphal entry of Jesus Christ into Jerusalem)
- Paschal Triduum, Easter Vigil (first liturgical celebration of the Resurrection of Jesus) and Easter. (The beginning of Eastertide)
- Feast of the Ascension
- Pentecost (descent of the Holy Spirit)
- Feast of Corpus Christi
- Feast of the Transfiguration
- Feast of the Assumption
- The Exaltation of the Holy Cross (Holy Rood Day) (commemorates the finding and annual elevation of the cross used in the crucifixion of Jesus Christ to the people)
- Reformation Day
- All Saints' Day
- Solemnity of Christ the King
- Totensonntag
- Feast of the Immaculate Conception
- Solemnity of All Saints

==== Jewish holidays ====
- Chag HaMatzot (Feast of Unleavened Bread – 7 or 8 days of consumption of matzo with wine and avoidance of leavened foods)
- Chanukkah (Feast of Dedication; Also called the Festival of Lights – Commemoration of the rededication of the Jerusalem Temple)
- Pesach (Passover – Deliverance of Jews from slavery in Egypt)
  - Lag BaOmer (A holiday celebrated on the 33rd day of the Counting of the Omer, which occurs on the 18th day of the Hebrew month of Iyar)
- Purim (Feast of Lots – Deliverance of Jews in Persia from extermination by Haman)
- Reishit Katzir (Feast of Firstfruits – Collecting and waving of grain bundles (barley or wheat); Occurs during the 7 days of unleavened bread after the Sabbath)
- Rosh Hashanah (Jewish New Year – First day of Tishrei every year)
- Shabbat (The 7th Day Sabbath – The day of rest and holiest day of the week, Saturday)
- Shavuot (Feast of Weeks – Wheat harvesting in Israel and the receiving of the Torah at Mount Sinai)
- Sukkot (Feast of Tabernacles; Also called the Feast of Ingathering – Dwelling within sukkahs for 7 days (in Israel) or 8 days (the diaspora); Considered by some to be a mini-campout)
  - Shemini Atzeret (A holiday sometimes confused as being the 8th day of Sukkot; Beginning of the rainy season in Israel)
    - Simchat Torah (Observed after Shemini Atzeret; Completion of the Sefer Torah)
- Yom Kippur (Day of Atonement – A day of fasting and repentance of one's sins from the past year)

==== Islamic holidays ====
- Ashura (Day of Atonement; Tenth day of Muharram. Muharram is the first month of the lunar year)
- Eid (feast): Date determined by the lunar calendar and observation of the Moon
  - Eid al-Adha (Feast of the Sacrifice; Tenth day of Dhu al-Hijjah, the twelfth and final month of the lunar year)
    - Arafah (Eve of Eid al-Adha)
  - Eid al-Fitr (Feast of Breaking the Fast; First day of Shawwal. It marks the end of Ramadan, the fasting month. Part of honoring this occasion is "zakaat ul-fitr" (giving alms to the needy on the day of Eid al-Fitr))
    - Chaand Raat (Eve of Eid al-Fitr)
- Holy Month of Ramadan (First day of Ramadan; A 30-day period of fasting to commemorate the first revelation of the Quran)
  - Jumu'atul-Wida (Friday of Farewell; Last Friday of Ramadan before the celebration of Eid al-Fitr)
  - Laylat al-Qadr (Night of Decree; Last ten days of Ramadan. The revealing of the first verses of the Quran to Muhammad)
- Isra and Mi'raj (Night Journey; Ascension of Muhammad into Heaven)
- Jumu'ah (More commonly known as the Day of Assembly or the Day of Gathering; Held every Friday of the lunar year as an alternative to the Zuhr prayer)
- Mawlid (Birth of Muhammad)
- Mid-Sha'ban (Bara'a Night; Decisions of the fortunes of men in the approaching year)
- Nuzul Al Quran (First revelation of the Quran)
- Raʼs as-Sanah al-Hijrīyah (Islamic New Year; First day of Muharram every year)

==== Baháʼí holidays ====
- 1st Day of Ridván
- 9th Day of Ridván
- 12th Day of Ridván
- Ascension of `Abdu'l-Bahá
- Ascension of Bahá'u'lláh
- Baháʼí Naw-Rúz
- Birth of Bahá'u'lláh
- Birth of the Báb
- Day of the Covenant
- Declaration of the Báb
- Martyrdom of the Báb

==== Mandaean holidays ====
- Parwanaya
- Dehwa Daimana
- Kanshi u-Zahli
- Dehwa Rabba
- Dehwa d-Šišlam Rabba
- Dehwa Hanina
- Ead Fel
- Ashoriya

=== Dharmic holidays (Indian) ===
==== Buddhist holidays ====
- Asalha Puja
- Blessed Rainy Day (Bhutanese)
- Bodhi Day
- Bon Festival (Japanese)
- Buddha Jayanti or Vesak
- Kathina
- Diwali
- Magha Puja
- Pchum Ben (Cambodian)
- Poya

==== Hindu holidays ====
- Akshaya Tritiya
- Bhogi
- Diwali
  - Bhaubeej
  - Diwali (Govardhan Puja)
  - Diwali (Lakshmi Puja)
- Durga Puja
- Ekadasi
- Ganesh Chaturthi
- Gokul Ashtami
- Gudhi Padwa
- Guru Purnima
- Holi
- Karthikai Deepam
- Karva Chauth
- Krishna Janmaashtami
- Lohri
- Mahalakshmi Vrata
- Mahashivratri
- Makar Sankranti
- Mysore Dasara
- Naga Panchami
- Navratri
- Nyepi
- Onam
- Pongal
- Raksha Bandhan
- Rama-Lilas
- Ram Navami
- Thaipusam
- Ugadi/ Vishu
- Vaikunta Ekadasi
- Vaisakhi
- Vijayadashami

==== Jain holidays ====
- Diwali
- Kshamavani
- Paryushana

==== Sikh holidays ====
- Bandi Chhor Divas
- Gurupurab
- Guru Tegh Bahadur's Martyrdom Day
- Hola Mohalla
- Vaisakhi

=== Pagan holidays ===
==== Ancient Greek/Roman holidays ====
- Adonia/Rosalia
- Dionysia/Bacchanalia
- Floralia
- Kronia/Saturnalia
- Lemuralia
- Lykaia/Lupercalia
- Parentalia
- Vestalia
- Vinalia

==== Celtic, Norse, and Neopagan holidays ====
In the order of the Wheel of the Year:

- Samhain/Halloween (Celtic): 31 October – 1 November, Celtic New Year, first day of winter
- Yule (Norse): 21–22 December, winter solstice, Celtic midwinter
- Imbolc/Candlemas (Celtic): 1–2 February, Celtic first day of spring
- Ostara/Easter (Norse): 21–22 March, spring equinox, Celtic midspring
- Beltane/May Day (Celtic): 30 April – 1 May, Celtic first day of summer
- Litha (Norse): 21–22 June, summer solstice, Celtic midsummer
- Lughnasadh/Lammas (Celtic): 1–2 August, Celtic first day of autumn
- Mabon (Norse): 21–22 September, autumn equinox, Celtic midautumn

=== Other holidays ===
==== East Asian holidays ====
- Chinese New Year
- Chongyang Festival
- Dragon Boat Festival
- Fukagawa Festival
- First Full Moon Festival
- Ghost Festival
- Gion Festival
- Harvest Festival
- Japanese Autumn Festival
- Kanda Festival
- Mid-Autumn Festival
- Qingming Festival
- Qixi Festival
- Sanja Festival
- Sannō Festival
- Tado Festival

== Messianic interpretations of Jewish holidays for Christians ==
The following table is a chart based on a Messianic Jewish perspective of the 9 biblical holidays (including the Sabbath), along with their times and days of occurrence, references in the Bible, and how they point to Yeshua (Jesus). All the holidays shown below are major with the exceptions of the Feast of Dedication and the Feast of Lots which are minor festivals.

Holiday	Season (Northern hemisphere)	Month	Biblical references	Symbolic significance
Passover	Spring	14 Nisan	Levites 23:4-8, Words 16:1-8, Matthew 26:17-27, John 6:1-71–11:55	He dies.
Feast of Unleavened Bread	Spring	15-21 Nisan	Levites 23:5-8, Matthew 27:1-50, 1 Corinthians 5:7-8	He is buried and rids His House of sin.
Feast of Firstfruits	Spring	16 Nisan	Levites 23:9-14, Matthew 28:1-6, 1 Corinthians 15:20-23	He rises from the dead.
Feast of Weeks	Spring	6-7 Sivan	Levites 23:15-22, Numbers 28:26-31, Tobit 2:1, Acts 2:1-4	He sends the comforter (The Holy Spirit) 7 weeks later.
Feast of Trumpets	Autumn	1-2 Tishrei	Levites 23:23-25, Daniel 7:25, 1 Corinthians 5:8–15:52	He returns.
Day of Atonement	Autumn	10 Tishrei	Levites 23:26-27, Matthew 24:29-30, Romans 11:25-29, Hebrews 9:7	He judges the non-believers.
Feast of Tabernacles	Autumn	15-21 Tishrei	Levites 23:33-43, John 7:1–10:21, Ephesians 2:20-22, Revelation 21:3	He will gather us for the Marriage Supper of the Lamb.
Feast of Dedication	Autumn-Winter	25 Kislev-2/3 Tevet	Maccabees 4:52-59, John 10:22-23	He is the Light of the World.
Feast of Lots	Winter	14 Adar	Esther 9:20-31	He delivers Israel and brings salvation to His people.
The 7th Day Sabbath	Every Saturday of the year	All months of the year	Levites 23:3, Words 5:12-14, Hebrews 4:9-11	He will dwell with us for a perpetual day of rest.

== Western winter holidays in the Northern Hemisphere ==
The following holidays are observed to some extent at the same time during the Southern Hemisphere's summer, with the exception of Winter Solstice.

- Winter Solstice (the longest night and shortest day of the year) or Yule (Winter solstice, around 21–22 December in the Northern Hemisphere and 21–22 June in the Southern Hemisphere) – The solstice celebrations are traditionally marked with anything that symbolizes or encourages life. Decorating evergreens with bright objects and lights, singing songs, giving gifts, feasting and romantic events are often included. For Neopagans this is the celebration of the death and rebirth of the Sun and is one of the eight sabbats on the Wheel of the Year.
- Christmas Eve (24 December) – Day before Christmas. Traditions usually include big feasts at night to celebrate the day to come. It is the night when Santa Claus delivers presents to all the good children of the world.
- Christmas Day (25 December) – Christian holiday commemorating the birth of Jesus. Traditions include gift-giving, the decoration of trees and houses, and Santa Claus folktales.
- Hanukkah (25 Kislev–2 Tevet – almost always in December) – Jewish holiday celebrating the defeat of Seleucid forces who had tried to prevent Israel from practicing the Jewish faith, and also celebrating the miracle of the Menorah lights burning for eight days with only enough olive oil for one day supply. In Hebrew, "Hanukkah" means "dedication" or "to dedicate".
- Saint Stephen's Day or Second Day of Christmas (26 December) – Holiday observed in many European countries.
- Boxing Day (26 December or 27 December) – Holiday observed in many Commonwealth countries on the first non-Sunday after Christmas.
- New Year's Eve (31 December) – Night before New Year's Day. Usually observed with celebrations and festivities in anticipation of the new year.
- New Year's Day (1 January) – Holiday observing the first day of the year in the Gregorian calendar.

== Secular holidays ==
Many other days are marked to celebrate events or people, around the world, but are not strictly holidays as time off work is rarely given.

=== International ===
- Halloween – (31 October, especially in the UK and former British colonies, including the United States, Canada, and Australia). Also called All Hallows' Eve, it is a highly secularized outgrowth of Christian All Hallows' Day on 1 November, and pagan Celtic Samhain (halfway point between autumn equinox and winter solstice).
- International Men's Day – (19 November in Canada, Australia, India, Jamaica, Trinidad and Tobago, United Kingdom, Singapore, South Africa, and Malta)
- International Women's Day – (8 March, particularly in Australia, former Soviet bloc countries and mainland China)
- May Day, Labor/Labour Day, or International Workers' Day – (1 May in many European and South American countries. The United States and Canada both celebrate on the first Monday in September)
- Saint Nicholas Day – (5 or 6 December in the Netherlands, Belgium, Lebanon, and other countries)
- Saint Patrick's Day – (17 March in Ireland, the United States, Canada, and other countries by people of Irish descent or heritage)
- Saint Valentine's Day – (14 February in the United States, Canada, and many other countries as a day to celebrate love and affection)
- Thanksgiving Day – (4th Thursday in November in the United States, 2nd Monday in October in Canada). Generally observed as an expression of gratitude, traditionally to God, for the autumn harvest. It is traditionally celebrated with a meal shared among friends and family in which turkey is eaten. In Canada, since the climate is colder than in the US, the harvest season begins and ends earlier.

=== Regional ===
Other secular holidays not observed internationally
Name	Date	Place	Details
Chosŏn'gŭl Day or Hangeul Day	15 January	North Korea	
Chosŏn'gŭl Day or Hangeul Day	9 October	South Korea	
Martin Luther King Jr. Day	3rd Monday in January	United States	Honors Civil rights movement leader Martin Luther King Jr.
Australia Day	26 January	Australia	National day of Australia
Groundhog Day	2 February	United States and Canada	
Darwin Day	12 February		Birthday of Charles Darwin to highlight his contribution to science.
Family Day	3rd Monday in February	Various regions of Canada	
Washington's Birthday	3rd Monday in February	United States	Federal holiday. Honors Founding Father George Washington.
National Science Appreciation Day	26 March	United States	Celebration of science and scientists.
Confederate Memorial Day	Celebrated by the original Confederate States at various times during the year; still celebrated on the fourth Monday in April in Alabama.	Parts of the United States	
Siblings Day	10 April	Originally celebrated only in the United States. Can now be celebrated in various countries around the world.	
Patriots' Day	3rd Monday in April	Massachusetts and Maine, United States	
Earth Day	22 April	Celebrated in many countries as a day to cherish nature.	
Children's Day	23 April	Turkey	National Sovereignty and Children's Day
King's Day	27 April	Netherlands	
Constitution Day	3 May	Poland	One of the two most important national holidays (the other is National Independence Day on 11 November). It commemorates the proclamation of the Constitution of 3 May 1791 (the first modern constitution in Europe) by the Sejm of the Polish–Lithuanian Commonwealth.
Youth Day	4 May	People's Republic of China	Commemorates Beijing students who protested against Western imperialism on this day.
Cinco de Mayo	5 May	Mexico State of Puebla & Parts of the United States	
Parents' Day	8 May	South Korea	
Parents' Day	4th Sunday in July	United States	Proclaimed by Bill Clinton in 1994.
Internet Day	17 May	Parts of Latin America	
Victoria Day	Last Monday before 25 May	Canada, also Edinburgh and Dundee in Scotland	Birthday of Queen Victoria.
Children's Day	2nd Sunday in June	Various	
Flag Day	14 June	United States	
Flag Day	2 May	Poland	
Juneteenth	19 June	United States	Federal holiday commemorates the abolition of slavery in Texas.
Canada Day	1 July	Canada	Celebration of the date of the Confederation of Canada. Formerly known as Dominion Day, as this was the day on which Canada became a self-governing Dominion within the British Empire.
Independence Day	Various days; 4 July in the United States and other dates in many other nations		
Indian Arrival Day	Various days	Official holiday in Trinidad and Tobago, Guyana, Suriname, Mauritius, Grenada, Saint Vincent and the Grenadines	Celebrated on the day when Indians arrived in various European colonies; Celebrated with parades re-enacting when indentured Indian immigrants landed in their respective colonies.
Pioneer Day	24 July	Utah, United States	
People's Liberation Army Day	1 August	Mainland territory of the People's Republic of China	
Grandparents' Day	Sunday after Labor Day	United States	Proclaimed by Jimmy Carter in 1978.
Columbus Day	2nd Monday in October	United States	Honors explorer Christopher Columbus.
Indigenous Peoples' Day	2nd Monday in October	United States	Celebrates the Indigenous peoples of the Americas.
Nanomonestotse	Starts 3rd Monday in October		Celebration of peace, observed within some Native American families.
Republic Day	29 October	Turkey	
Guy Fawkes Night	5 November	Great Britain and other countries of the Commonwealth	In memory of the failed Gunpowder Plot by Guy Fawkes.
Melbourne Cup Day	1st Tuesday in November	Victoria, Australia	The day of the Melbourne Cup.
Remembrance Day or Veterans Day	11 November	United States, Canada and other Commonwealth nations	
Remembrance Day	11 September	United States	
Kwanzaa	26 December to 1 January	United States	Celebration of African heritage created in 1966 by African-American activist Maulana Karenga. Holiday's name comes from "matunda ya kwanza" ("first fruits" in Swahili). Kinara, a seven-branched candleholder, means seven main concepts of Kwanzaa.

== Consecutive holidays ==
- In the People's Republic of China, the Spring Festival and National Day are week-long holidays in the mainland territory known as Golden Weeks.
- In Colombia, in the holy week there are consecutive holidays Jueves Santo (Holy Thursday) and Viernes Santo (Holy Friday) with variable dates in March or April.
- In The Netherlands, Remembrance of the Dead is celebrated on 4 May from 19:00 and Liberation Day on the 5th. This way Remembrance of the Dead and Liberation Day constitute one remembrance: for both Victims and Liberation.
- In Ireland, Saint Patrick's Day can occasionally occur in Holy Week, the week before Easter; in this case the three holidays (Saint Patrick's Day, Good Friday, and Easter Monday) plus three days' leave can result in a 10-day break. See Public holidays in the Republic of Ireland.
- In Poland during holidays on 1 and 3 May, when taking a few days of leave can result in 9-day-long holidays; this is called The Picnic (or Majówka).
- In Japan, golden-week lasts roughly a full week. Then, in 2007, the law was amended so that if any 2 public holidays occur both on a weekday and are separated by a day, then that intermediate day shall also be a public holiday, thus creating a 3-day-long public holiday.
- In Australia, New Zealand, Africa, Canada, Ireland, Poland, Russia, the British Virgin Islands and the UK, a public holiday otherwise falling on a Sunday will result in observance of the public holiday on the next available weekday (generally Monday). This arrangement results in a long weekend.
- In the British Virgin Islands, the Emancipation Festival is celebrated from the first Monday in August and ends on the Wednesday of that week for a three-day holiday in celebration of the emancipation from slavery on 1 August 1834.

== Unofficial holidays, awareness days, and other observances ==
These are holidays that are not traditionally marked on calendars. These holidays are celebrated by various groups and individuals. Some are designed to honor or promote a cause or a historical event not officially recognized, while a few others are both celebrated and intended as humorous distractions.

- 420 (20 April) (day celebrating cannabis culture)
- April Fools' Day (1 April)
- Asteroid Day – (30 June, global). Founded in 2014 (initiated after the 2013 Chelyabinsk meteor air burst) and recognized in 2016 by the United Nations to mark the 30 June 1908 Tunguska event and raise awareness about the hazards of asteroid impacts.
- Bicycle Day (19 April)
- Black Love Day (13 February; United States)
- Black Friday or Buy Nothing Day (day after Thanksgiving Day in the United States)
- Bloomsday (16 June based on James Joyce's 1922 novel Ulysses)
- Festivus (23 December)
- Friendship Day (first Sunday in August)
- Galactic Tick Day (occurs every 633.7 days, starting 2 October 1608)
- Giving Tuesday (Tuesday following Thanksgiving Day, Black Friday and Cyber Monday in the United States)
- Global Accessibility Awareness Day (third Thursday of May)
- International Apostrophe Day (15 August)
- International GNSS Day (23 October)
- International Client's Day
- International Saucisson's Day (28 March)
- International Talk Like a Pirate Day (19 September)
- Marathon Monday (local name in Boston for Patriot's Day)
- Memon Day (10 April)
- Mischief Night (30 October)
- Mole Day (23 October)
- Monkey Day (14 December)
- National Cancer Survivors Day (first Sunday in June)
- National Cigar Day (February 27)
- National Gorilla Suit Day (31 January)
- National Hugging Day (21 January)
- National Puzzle Day (29 January)
- No Pants Day (first Friday of May)
- Pi Day (14 March)
- Record Store Day (third Saturday of April)
- Mario Day (10 March)
- National First Ladies Day (last Saturday in April)
- Singles Awareness Day (15 February)
- International Pipe Smoking Day (20 February)
- Star Wars Day (4 May) "May the Fourth be with you"
- Super Bowl Sunday (day of the National Football League championship)
- Sweetest Day (third Saturday in October)
- Tax Freedom Day
- Towel Day (25 May) (tribute to the author Douglas Adams)
- White Day (14 March)
- World Animal Day (4 October)
- World Backup Day (31 March)
- World Peace Day (21 September)
- World Sepsis Day (13 September)
- World Theatre Day (27 March)

== See also ==
- List of month-long observances
- List of environmental dates
- List of food days
- List of generic types of observances
