= List of observances set by the Baháʼí calendar =

This table is determined by when the March Equinox falls. It fell on March 20 from 2018 to 2021 and will fall on March 21 in 2022–2023. All Baha'i observances begin at the sundown prior to the date listed, and end at sundown of the date in question unless otherwise noted. The Birth of the Báb and Birth of Baháʼu'lláh fall on November 5–6 in 2021.

Holiday name	Equinox on March 19	Equinox on March 20	Equinox March 21
Feast of 'Alá' (Loftiness)	March 1	March 2	March 3
Month of Fasting	March 1-March 19	March 2-March 20	March 3–March 21
Baháʼí Naw-Rúz/Feast of Bahá (Splendour)	March 20	March 21	March 22
Feast of Jalál (Glory)	April 8	April 9	April 10
First Day of Ridván	April 20	April 21	April 22
Feast of Jamál (Beauty)	April 27	April 28	April 29
Ninth Day of Ridván	April 28	April 29	April 30
Twelfth Day of Ridván	May 1	May 2	May 3
Feast of 'Azamat (Grandeur)	May 16	May 17	May 18
Declaration of the Báb	May 23	May 24	May 25
Ascension of Baháʼu'lláh	May 28	May 29	May 30
Feast of Núr (Light)	June 4	June 5	June 6
Feast of Rahmat (Mercy)	June 23	June 24	June 25
Martyrdom of the Báb	July 9	July 10	July 11
Feast of Kalimát (Words)	July 12	July 13	July 14
Feast of Kamál (Perfection)	July 31	August 1	August 2
Feast of Asmáʼ (Names)	August 19	August 20	August 21
Feast of 'Izzat (Might)	September 7	September 8	September 9
Feast of Mashíyyat (Will)	September 26	September 27	September 28
Feast of 'Ilm (Knowledge)	October 15	October 16	October 17
Birth of the Báb	varies	varies	varies
Birth of Baháʼu'lláh	varies	varies	varies
Feast of Qudrat (Power)	November 3	November 4	November 5
Feast of Qawl (Speech)	November 22	November 23	November 24
Day of the Covenant	November 24	November 25	November 26
Ascension of ʻAbdu'l-Bahá	November 26	November 27	November 28
Feast of Masá'il (Questions)	December 10	December 11	December 12
Feast of Sharaf (Honor)	December 29	December 30	December 31
Feast of Sultán (Sovereignty)	January 17	January 18	January 19
Feast of Mulk (Dominion)	February 6	February 7	February 8
Ayyám-i-Há (Different dates are used on leap years)	February 25 – February 29 / March 1	February 26 – March 1 / 2	February 27 – March 2

== See also ==
- List of observances set by the Solar Hijri calendar
