= Thelma Thurston Gorham =

American journalist, organization leader, activist

- Born: Thelma Thurston; February 12, 1913; Kansas City, Missouri, US
- Died: January 7, 1992 (aged 78); Tallahassee, Florida, US
- Occupations: Journalist, Educator

Thelma Thurston Gorham (1913–1992) was an American journalist, newspaper editor, professor, and a Bahá’í, whose career spanned Black newspapers, including a military publication, teaching at universities, and civil‑rights–era public discourse. Born in segregated Kansas City, Missouri, she rose from an overcrowded school system and worked as a domestic laborer to become the first Black student of journalism at the University of Minnesota. After graduating in 1935, she quickly emerged as a rising figure in African‑American journalism, serving as reporter, editor, and feature writer for her first jobs at The Kansas City Call before moving into national visibility, often switching between higher education professorships and practicing editorialships.

Already working at the then-named historically black college (HBCU) Hampton Institute, and married in the lead-up to World War II, Gorham became the only woman — and the only African‑American woman — to be functionally chief editor of any official U.S. Army newspaper despite policies to the contrary. This was The Apache Sentinel at Fort Huachuca, Arizona, where her paper chronicled the lives of Black servicemen and their families. This achievement was trumpeted as "The most radical changes in Negro journalism … during World War II." by California Eagle editor Charlotta Bass. After the war, she was briefly an editor at The Crisis, the NAACP’s flagship publication, taught journalism at the HBCU Lincoln University, Missouri, and completed a master’s degree at the University of Minnesota in Journalism, before going on to be chief editor in further newspapers. Her work in the 1940s and 1950s also included public relations, magazine editing, and extensive freelance writing across the West Coast and then the Midwest, and mother to her only child.

Gorham joined the Bahá’í Faith in 1954, finding its teachings on racial unity and spiritual renewal became a springboard for her journalism and public commentary. Her widely read editorials on integration, faith, and social change — particularly her series “How Ready Are We for Integration” — earned recognition from the then named National Conference of Jews and Christians and positioned her as a leading voice in Oklahoma’s mid‑century civil‑rights landscape. After representing the Faith in a religion-in-college conference in Hawaii, she helped the first Journalism program to be founded and get accredited at an HBCU, at Florida A&M University in Tallahassee, the Capital of Florida. An academic biography says: "Up until the early 1980s, she was the most exciting black female journalist in the country." Throughout her career, she combined professional accomplishment with a commitment to interracial understanding, women’s leadership, and the moral dimensions of social progress, with lifetime achievement awards as well as posthumous ones.

== Early life ==
Thelma Thurston was born February 21, 1913, to African-Americans Frank and Bertha Thurston, in segregated Kansas City, Missouri. In January 1920, she was living with her grandparents, John and Anga Thurston. Her grandfather was a freight handler. She attended the Black public schools in Kansas City, and, in 1925, at the age of twelve, moved with her mother to Detroit, where they worked as maids. There, she attended Hamtramck High School and Northern High School before moving back to Kansas City, where she attended Northeast Junior High School and Sumner High School, as it was then called, amid the chaos of the Great Depression. There, she graduated from Sumner High School in 1931. The school was severely overcrowded. A Sumner High English teacher, Scottie P. Davis, inspired Thurston to write about the good news of the Black community, not just criminals.

Thurston sought admission to the University of Missouri but was denied because she was black-skinned. She considered the University of Kansas, but chose not to because it practiced racial segregation on campus. Instead, she became the first black-skinned student in journalism at the University of Minnesota at Minneapolis.

In her first year of college in 1931, Thelma was invited to join Sigma Epsilon Sigma academic sorority on campus, though at some point she was asked to leave. In early 1932, Thurston spoke at a bi-racial YMCA/YWCA group on the topic of James Weldon Johnson's God's Trombones, a collection of Negro sermons. The summer of 1934, she was announced as one of twelve who joined another honorary journalism sorority.

In her senior year, Thurston was among the YWCA student committee that sponsored James Weldon Johnson speaking at a YWCA luncheon while in town to address the state legislature on an anti-lynching bill. Thurston reported on his appearance for The Minneapolis Spokesman.

With the majority of the Great Depression past, Thurston graduated in the spring of 1935 with a Bachelor of Arts in Journalism from the University of Minnesota at Minneapolis, while living in St. Paul. She was one of three Black women in the entire graduating class in 1935. However, an instructor for a central class of her program failed to set up a newspaper internship for her, as was customary for all students.

== Career ==
Gorham would go on to alternate between newspaper editorship positions and professorships usually at HBCUs.

=== The Call ===
After graduating, Thurston's first placement was doing various jobs for the African-American Kansas City Call. She was visible there by October, registering in the US Decadal Census as living in Kansas City, Missouri, since at least 1935, and employed as a reporter. She soon worked as a reporter covering the police for The Call. By 1938, she was an editor for The Call and its chief feature writer. In early 1939, Thurston was running for school board office, though she lost the race. Decades later, she said, "I couldn't trust my own people.… African-American men tried to knife me." That summer, Thurston heard Mary McLeod Bethune speak at a club meeting in town.

In 1940 she was still working with The Call, and the US Census had her living with her mother.

Thurston heard of the Bahá'í Faith about this time, though no further details are known. Though some sources say she married Richard Gorham in 1939, many sources detail her marriage on August 20, 1941. Her marriage was announced, and her parents returning from the marriage of their daughter in September.

By 1941, she was the bureau news editor and feature writer for The Call, and had served there for six years as a writer.

=== Hampton Institute ===
In November 1941, Thurston started working with the HBCU Hampton Institute(today a University) in Virginia. By December, and the Attack on Pearl Harbor, her husband had been drafted. An article of hers was published in the African-American newspaper, The Pittsburgh Courier, which also called her a "recent bride", and another article was published in April in The Jackson Advocate of Jackson, Mississippi.

She also began to cherish a dream of visiting Africa: "…. Since the early 1940's, Ghana has been the focus of my African dream.…. Perhaps the answer goes back to 1941 when I was working as assistant director of public relations at Hampton Institute in Hampton, Virginia. One of my self-initiated, extracurricular tasks was the organization of a Foreign Students Association.… The courtesy, and even courtliness, of the young men in the association was a refreshing contrast to the manners of the American-born students. And to listen to the students talk about their goals for their homelands and their countrymen was sheer joy to me.… it was the students from the Gold Coast with whom some of my closest associations developed.”

By the summer of 1942, husband Richard was initially stationed at Camp Funston in Kansas. She gave up her Hampton Institute position, briefly worked with The Omaha Star, and then moved with her husband to Fort McClellan, Alabama, where Gorham stayed in Aniston. But within the year, he was transferred again, this time to Fort Huachuca in southern Arizona, where he served as a communications sergeant. Wherever she went, she got jobs in journalism and thrived.

=== The Apache Sentinel ===
June 1942 opens with a set of poems of Gorham's published in The Pittsburgh Courier. Already described as having a column on advice for wives of servicemen, formerly of the Kansas City Call and teacher at the Hampton Institute, by January 1943, she had published another article with The Courier, but also one in The Chicago Defender, and ‘’The Crisis’’, all focused on life at the Fort. Fort Huachuca housed the largest single group of African Americans in the Army. Gorham's coverage was picked up in 2010 by a Women's encyclopedia: Gorham's unfinished plywood shack for a home while stationed at Fort Huachuca was shared with eleven couples. Each room was about seven feet square with only two army cots; everyone shared two sinks for all needs, and there were no cooking facilities.

She was then hired by The Apache Sentinel before July 1943. Captain David A. Lane had given management of The Sentinel to Gorham, ultimately with the title Technical Advisor, and had been on an overseas assignment in January 1944. Her job as chief editor at The Apache Sentinel remained substantially the same, despite titles, save for two army orders - one that no civilian could be the editor of a post newspaper, "so she was designated associate editor", and then that no civilian could write an editorial, so she became a "technical adviser", who could, and someone else became the official editor. However, she functionally became the only woman editor - and Black woman editor - of an official army newspaper in the country.

A later writer said: "…it was more a driving sense of personal accomplishment that compelled [her] to pursue a career, rather than militancy of feminism." But Gorham's editorship of the Apache Sentinel was commented upon by Charlotta Bass, editor-publisher of The California Eagle: "The most radical changes in Negro journalism came about during World War II.… for the first time in history a Negro woman was editor of an Army newspaper…." She served 22 months as editor of The Special Services Bulletin and The Apache Sentinel, official publications of the Armed Forces Special Services Division Service Command Unit 1922. She also served as publicity assistant to the Post Public Relations Officer at the Fort. She finished the period writing articles published in Tulsa for The Oklahoma Eagle.

=== The Crisis and the Labor School ===
With the War ending, her husband was discharged in October 1944, and the Gorhams were visible visiting Los Angeles. She represented a number of Negro weekly newspapers on the West Coast as an accredited correspondent during the United Nations Conference on International Organization held in San Francisco from April to June 1945. The winter of 1945-1946 Gorham did a brief stint as managing editor of The Crisis, official organ of the NAACP, starting while living in San Francisco but briefly moved to the national headquarters in the Wendell Willkie building, New York City, Her final piece for The Crisis was the short story "It's never too early: a trilogy" in March, also republished in 2011. And Gorham published a book, Aquarina for black-skinned children through the University of Minnesota back in January 1946.

In the academic year of 1946-7, Gorham was an instructor with the California Labor School. She also served as part-time publicity director of the NAACP West Coast Regional Office in San Francisco, and editor of the Alpha Kappa Alpha official publication The Ivy Leaf. She had gained that position during their conference in Cleveland on world peace. She was editor-in-chief of the publication from 1946 to 1949.

=== Lincoln University and a Master's Degree ===
Gorham started at the HBCU Lincoln University, Missouri, as Assistant Professor in the School of Journalism for the 1947-1948 school year. She would teach here for four years, 1947-1951. In late June 1948, she rejoined her husband in California, traveling from Lincoln University to the Berkley area, and this time pursued graduate studies at Stanford University for the summer. She recorded some graduate-level coursework in the summer of 1948 at Stanford University. The couple had a son named Darryl Theodore Thurston, born in September in Minnesota.

In March 1949, Gorham opened the Journalism Forum at the Lincoln University conference, and in the summer worked at the University of Minnesota on her Master's Degree in Journalism while still an instructor at Lincoln University; she, her son, her sisters, and her father, lived in Minneapolis.

In the 1950-51 school year, she helped organize the Foreign Students Association at Lincoln University. Her Master's dissertation was published as the book Negro Newsmen and Practices of Pressure Groups in the Middle West, which was republished in 1952 after her degree was finished.

She graduated in 1951 with a Master of Arts in Journalism from the University of Minnesota at Minneapolis. Her thesis reviewed "social and professional characteristics of newsmen working on seven Negro weeklies in four midwestern metropolitan centers - Chicago, St. Louis, Greater Kansas City, and Omaha" including interviews and a survey of opinions and attitudes. She also initiated her PhD work. That April, a poem by her, "Sunset down a country lane”, was published in a national teacher's journal.

=== St. Louis ===
After graduating with her Master's degree, a number of initiatives took place. First, in April 1951, she led workshops at Lincoln University on yearbook preparation, and attended a banquet for the university's Women Association. By that October, she had a county position working with three YWCAs of St. Louis. She was soon visible working at the job, at community events, and on regional excursions. She was a speaker at an interracial meeting in early May in the Venice-Lincoln, IL, area. She was also profiled where she positively commented on the rising racial integration effort.

In December 1952, she also had a newspaper article published through her company, Gorham Enterprises, as well as an editorial marking the changes of late 1952. A new magazine, Set-Up, was launched that spring, with Gorham as chief editor. While that effort unfolded, by October 1953, she was known to also work with a project named the Great Books Program in the city public library, some of which continued into 1955.

Stepping into early 1954, mentions of Gorham begin in February when she composed an article of events in St. Louis published in St. Paul reporting on the Supreme Court test case, quoting comments of Morehouse College president supporting ending segregation:

1) The religious approach which see segregation as incompatible with the best that there is in the Christian gospel;

2) The point of view which finds it inconsistent with our democratic pronouncements as found in the federal Constitution, and

3) The world-view which see that America, the greatest democracy in the world, cannot assume the spiritual leadership of the world in segregated economy."

Segregation, and its ending, was also no longer an issue just of society - her son was approaching 6 years old that fall. By March, she started publishing articles for The Oklahoma Eagle in Tulsa, where she consulted as well, and then was named a Vice-President and Managing Editor by April.

=== Tulsa ===
Gorham joined the Bahá'í Faith in 1954, though we don't know the date, more for her son "to have a religious base”, although she was already familiar with the religion and it would come to inform a wide range of her actions. It remains as yet unknown how much contact she had with Bahá'ís in Minneapolis/St. Paul/St. Louis, or in Oklahoma, or elsewhere, and/or publications mentioning Bahá'ís in the period before she joined the religion. It can be said that she had a copy of an insert from Bahá'í News on "Building the Bahá'í Community" dated from September 1952, which she kept in her collection of items throughout her life.

Tulsa lacked a measurable Bahá'í presence in the period. The Bahá'ís of nearby and much bigger Oklahoma City were a community of 14 adults as of January 1955. In 1955, about 20 Bahá'ís were known in the state, so over half the Baha'is in the state lived in Oklahoma City. They had contacts in Tulsa from 1940, literature was in the Tulsa library in 1946, and it was a goal city for Bahá'ís in the 1950s. The Oklahoma City Bahá'ís held many meetings at the integrated and Black community-centered YWCA, founded by Drusilla Dundee, sister of the founder of The Black Dispatch newspaper. An article profiling the religion is echoed in Oklahoma from Chicago covering the International Conference and approaching dedication of the Baháʼí House of Worship, and briefly touching on the history and teachings of the religion. There was coverage of the temple's opening dedication in early May. Indeed, there was further coverage in mid-May from the Associated Negro Press (ANP) profiling the religion, and highlighting its stance on race issues in the country, and published in The Oklahoma Eagle. The unnamed reporter of the ANP article interviewed Ruhiyyih Khanum, who gave her a review of African-American connections with the Faith, starting with Louis Gregory, and going on to others in other places. However, later in the coverage, there was a set of points in the article that could serve as connections for Gorham. Among the speakers at meetings for the dedication of the Temple was Charles H. Wesley, then president of Central State College in Wilberforce, Ohio. And a week later, Wesley was the speaker at the Booker T. Washington High School commencement in Tulsa.

A couple of series of editorials by Gorham appear, one a stand-alone set often titled "How Ready are We for Integration" across September-December, and the other in a regular column "Distaff Diary: One Woman's Viewpoint". Amidst the series, Gorham also aided a series of public talks on integration held in St. Louis through YMCA affiliations.

Gorham again addresses the issue of prejudice and "…the acceptance of second class citizenship on both sides of the color line, the time has come to consider some of the things that can be done… to accentuate the positive in the trend toward desegregation and integration in American life.” She goes on to give various examples of the frustrations on both sides of the color line, with both sides seeking economic security, though the problem touches on other parts of life. The churches can have a far-reaching impact if they desegregated at least for emotional security. However, she feels that the churches have to lead on this. She also notes Mrs. Charles S. Johnson, wife of the president of Fisk University, mentioned the idea - that "11 o'clock on Sunday morning is the most segregated hour in America."

The editorial series of Gorham, "How Ready Are We for Integration", was the reason for an award from the National Conference of Jews and Christians as it was then named, for Brotherhood Week of February 1955, though the award went to the newspaper as such and not directly to Gorham.

It was later that summer, June 26, 1955, when Gorham was publicly avowed as a member of the Bahá'í Faith at a reception picnic in Oklahoma City, which was published July 2 in The Black Dispatch. The week after she had her picnic reception, she was at an integrated conference of the religion in Little Rock, Arkansas, along with Margaret Ruhe and others at the Lafayette Hotel.

=== Oklahoma City ===
Prior to accepting a position with the Oklahoma City Public Schools, Gorham was already the executive editor of the "militant" Black Dispatch, (according to the Omaha Star) essentially at the same time as her public identification as a Bahá'í in July 1955. Bahá'í meetings continued to be mentioned in The Dispatch in August. While still invited to speak at Black church functions, her next Bahá'í conference was held locally in early September. Later in September, Gorham penned a story of her own about a centenarian in town, and then returned to her editorial efforts. She examines the difficulty of bias, something we all hate when we notice it applied to us, while, when we do it, it seems most natural and appropriate. She writes, "By denying their children the rich experience of understanding and respecting and learning to love all humankind for the God that is in them, they relegate their children to outhouses of the mind and soul.… And if parents won't take the step, then the youth must make the move to free themselves by independent investigation of all available facts and by repudiation of the misinformation of their unthinking or misguided elders.” and proceeds to decry moves towards segregation in the Black community as well. Her next editorial came in early October, speaking of the death of Emmett Till and of her own son being raised in liberal circumstances about race and in an encounter with a prejudiced woman he had had. Her son said: "… I am a child of God, just the same as she is….” Her next editorial included comments like:

"But to be a devotee of religion as a solution to our problems is to be a 'long hair.' And it is not yet popular to be 'long-haired' in religion. Indeed, it is really not yet universally popular to be religious.… it appears that a grave need today is for a few 'long hairs' in religion - sincere devotees who will not be guilty of deprivation of the people through lust for leadership or through want of knowledge and understanding.… At mid-century, as mankind moves or is pushed - into the orbit of total integration, there are many challenges…. Perhaps the greatest of these is the challenge implicit in a law which proclaims and underlies the basic unity of all religion and the oneness of truth - a law which runs like a golden thread through all the great religions of the world… to love God as a father and love all men as children of the same father. Where men debate the issue of who is inferior or superior …all can agree with Baha'u'llah - the Manifestation of God in our time - that 'the lovers of mankind … these are the superior men, of whatever nation, creed, or race they may be."

January 1957 opens with the Bahá'í Assembly of Oklahoma City holding World Religion Day with Gorham as chair of the event. Gorham was chair of the assembly that year. In March, Gorham was speaker for the Bahá'í-sponsored "World Youth Day" at the YWCA on W. Park "Stockpiling for the Future: A Baha'i Looks at Youth". Gorham was also a teacher at the Black community school of Moon Junior High(later renamed). Her talk on youth owing their parents and the need for adults to get educated, and other community work going on was summarized/quoted in the Dispatch. In August, she received her certification as a Language Arts teacher in Oklahoma, She took graduate-level coursework at the University of Oklahoma at Norman in the summer of 1957.

Gorham's husband summarily left in later April, 1958, followed by the death of her brother in June and the end of the Gorham Enterprises business they had been running. The unexpected death of her brother while staying in her home caused a delay in her attempt to publish an article in The Oklahoma Teacher that summer. Gorham was named on the 1958 Bahá'í summer school program committee for the Southwestern School early in the year, held at Bachman's Lake YMCA Camp Kiwanis in November, in Dallas.

A number of sources outline the Gorhams in 1959 - they were listed on 17th Street in Oklahoma City. This year, as a member of the Bahá'í Faith, Gorham was elected as Secretary of the Local Spiritual Assembly of the Bahá'ís of Oklahoma City. She was also a teacher at F. D. Moon Junior High School and chair of its PTA, president of the Oklahoma City Urban League Guild, a journalist of the local chapter of Jack and Jill of America, and secretary of the 1959 year Southwestern Baha’i School committee. On her application for admission in pursuit of a PhD at Stanford in 1959, she listed references that would come from Dr. Ralph D. Casey of the University of California, Mitch Charnley of the University of Minnesota, and Dr. Charles Swanson of Curtis Publishing Co. of Philadelphia, PA.

=== Minnesota ===
Gorham was awarded a $5000 grant from Stanford University in April 1959. The award listed her as one of 18 recipients, splitting $100k from the Fund for Adult Education at Stanford University. Her profile listed her membership in the Society for Women in Journalism, Theta Sigma Phi, and that she was the first "Negro" student to be initiated into the organization. During her fellowship year at Stanford, she would be accompanied by her ten-year-old son, who would be enrolled as a pupil in the Stanford University Laboratory School. The plan was to study at the Stanford Institute for Communications Research during the school year of 1959-1960; in August, returning eastward, she was covered in The Chicago Defender as a guest speaker in Springfield, Illinois. Gorham took graduate-level classes from the Fall of 1959 into the second summer session of 1961.

In January 1960, she also wrote from the Minneapolis/St. Paul area in local newspapers. and that spring she was elected to Minneapolis Local Bahá'í Spiritual Assembly. In May, Gorham was a staff writer for campus The Minnesota Daily, and in July covered the NAACP convention for the ANP at Hotel Lowry as part of lifting Roy Wilkins to notability. In September, she covered Minneapolis youth issues and crime, was funded at the University of Minnesota at Minneapolis on a Ford Foundation fellowship, and she was set to join Southern University at Baton Rouge, where she would supervise the publication of The Digest school newspaper. Meanwhile, in the fall, she was added to the Bahá'í National Assembly's Interracial Teaching Committee, and published an article set on a series of fictional stories of people in a spectrum of conditions of race, ranging from not prejudiced, who stand up to violent opposition, to fairly prejudiced cases of people whose biased, conformist behaviors compromise too much. In October 1961, she received word that some work she had done in French was used to satisfy her work towards a PhD.

=== Louisiana, and Hawaii, and Oklahoma… ===
Around 1960-1962, Gorham was a teacher at HBCU Southern University in Louisiana, starting on staff for 1960-1961. She wrote in 1961 in the University of Minnesota at Minneapolis student newspaper that she was already committed to moving to Baton Rouge. As part of the trip, she took pictures, which are in her archives. She wrote of dreaming of being able to travel to Africa, first to Ghana, but then seeing the Bahá'í development in Uganda. She sees the rising wave of independence in Africa and Ghana, in particular, "because it appears to me that the black man has a definite role to play in bringing about the ultimate elimination of all sorts of prejudices and because the drama of the elimination of prejudices based on race may well be played out in Africa.… Because I believe that mankind is evolutionary and created to carry forward an ever advancing civilization and that all men are parts of one human family that must eventually be unified on this planet, I enjoy a ring-side seat wherever men are playing out their roles in this great drama. The drama is thrilling whether men make themselves ridiculous as they resist the inevitable with name-calling, jeers, legal barriers and taxation without representation; or whether they ennoble themselves as they move forward to accept the challenge…. now that the giant is awake and throwing off his shackles, my interest is divided between Ghana and Uganda. In this new or added interest I am again motivated by the desires to have a ring-side seat at another performance in the great drama of human evolution. This week in Kampala, Uganda, on a wind-swept hill some distance from the center of town a beautifully-domed, nine-sided building is being dedicated. It is the Mother Temple, Mashriqu'l-Adhkar of the Baha'i World Faith in Africa. It symbolizes the spiritual eagerness, and the physical agility with which the once sleeping giant is assuming the responsibilities of a new era, responding to the demands of the position that he must occupy in the family of mankind.… When and if I ever go to Ghana, I don't expect to find the experience strange and exotic.… I think I'll feel as though I had never left home.…"

In April 1961, she was visible working at the Southern University's Press Workshop. This is also when the Gorhams' divorce was finalized. At Southern University, she was listed as a market counselor, named Market Research Editor for World Mutual Exchange, Inc. and produced a report for them.

By July, Gorham was named to the Bahá'í National Spiritual Assembly's Public Information group. Gorham also put together an exhibit on the Faith hosted at the Library of Southern University in Baton Rouge.

In the winter of 1961-2, Gorham was named going to talk in Hawaii, officially representing the Bahá'ís, and it was widely covered in print media. The conference ran from November 5 to 9 with a series of events culminating with a dance on November 9. She was part of a panel of speakers on the television program “Conversations” on November 12. The host, Betty Smyser, was the first woman on Hawaii TV and a local pioneer in the realm of talk news on television.

Back on the mainland, Gorham served on the 1961-2 Bahá'í National Interracial Service Committee again, which held meetings in Nashville, Tennessee, arranging the Bahá'i community reaching out to African American leaders and developing a booklet "Fifty Years of Race Amity Among the Bahá'ís of the United States" by Allan Ward, hoping to use it in a Centennial Observance of the Emancipation Proclamation to be held in 1963. The National Spiritual Assembly also sponsored a "Short Course in Human Relations" at conferences held at the end of February, which regularly featured a non-Bahá'í Black speaker invited by local assemblies.

In January 1962, Gorham was among the faculty publicly calling on Southern University to reconsider its policy about students in protests. That year Gorham also had a poem published in Phylon, a semi-annual peer-reviewed academic journal covering culture in the United States from an African-American perspective:

This is freedom: a startled, fleeing rabbit,
The pure delight in a thing of beauty,
The yielding of discipline to force of habit;
The neglect by men of a thing called "duty”
To walk alone in majestic and wond'rous silence,
And, like Thoreau, philosophize and ponder
On the things that move ment to cruel violence,
While other phenomena excite only wonder.
This is freedom: a child's quick laughter,
A lilting dance, a bird's clear plaint,
The sudden surge to action that come after
The soft-spoken words of some soapbox saint;
Freedom is everything that oppressors abhor,
And one of life's few things worth fighting for.

— Freedom

During the school year 1962-3 she worked with the Opportunities Industrialization Center in Kansas City, Missouri, while being a teacher at Central High School. That year, Gorham also served on the Bahá'í South Central States Area Teaching Committee for Arkansas, Missouri, Kansas, and Nebraska; they held more-than-monthly meetings and produced a monthly bulletin, and was listed on the group again for the spring of 1963.

In the summer of 1963, Gorham helped produce a St. Stephen Baptist Church history - she edited and wrote an introduction, and spoke at a June evening service of the church's Women’s Day program. Gorham was also doing studies for her PhD, and was received at various luncheons as well as giving three Bahá'í firesides at a couple homes in August, including comments and slides about activities in The South, and challenges from the KKK. An article of Gorham's from the U.S. Negro World was published as a book, The Negro Press Review or The Negro press: past, present and future, and made into a directory.

=== Starting at Florida A&M University ===
In the fall of 1963, Gorham started with the Florida A&M University, (FAMU), as an associate professor. When she moved there with her son, she was listed as an isolated member of the Bahá'í Faith. She did register as an organizational group for the purposes of Bahá'í administration, but they also had no Center - it first came in 1997. One of her first public actions for the University was as Director of FAMU Public Relations, where she published information on disciplinary actions the university took against more than a hundred students involved in protests, with judgments leveled by court actions. In November, she was still noted working with Set-Up magazine out of St. Louis.

In January 1964, FAMU staff, including Gorham and students, led by the marching band, went on a trip to Nassau, where they were received by the Governor at the state mansion, among other receptions that were held. In March, she was the publicity coordinator and MC of the 14th FAMU Interscholastic Press Workshop Conference.

In January 1965, Gorham was the publicity director during the visit of Nat and Julian Adderley, famous FAMU alumni musicians. In her first documented appearance in Bahá'í circumstances in Tallahassee thus far identified, coming in Spring 1965, is when she introduced white Southerner Bahá'í Terah Cowart Smith at a Jack and Jill of America meeting held at FAMU. It is also known that Gorham sent FAMU students with journalism interests to work with The Capital Outlook newspaper, contributed articles of her own, and sometimes acted as editor, and other events.

That July, scholarly commentary of Gorham began to appear, starting with an early Who's Who listing of her at FAMU. The same month, Gorham received a "thank you" from FAMU Dean Mahlon Rhaney for specing out two advanced undergraduate classes, and six in total, on journalism for the university, when that was not her job, but the need was urgent.

In March 1966, Gorham introduced the speaker for Negro History Week in Tallahassee, and represented the University of Minnesota at the inauguration of Florida State University(FSU) president John Champion. In April, Gorham was among the representatives at a regional conference of the Public Relations Association, and co-chaired the FAMU Hospital conference. In June, there was coverage of the expanding journalism classes at FAMU, and Gorham was promoted to full-time staff. Son Darryl was given an award too. Gorham attended her Class of 1931 reunion at Sumner High School in July. In September, Gorham spoke for the Bahá'í observance for World Peace Day, and in October, she was listed as a student advisor, the faculty leader of a student press association conference.

February 1967, Gorham gave a talk for the Unitarian Universalists church on her religion. A couple of weeks later, Gorham gave a talk at a meeting of the Bahá'í community, while her son gave a talk in early March. That same day of her son's talk, Gorham portrayed the Bahá'í Fast in an article published in The Tallahassee Democrat.

In June, Gorham represented the Friends of FAMU Hospital, making a formal request that staff be retained under new county management, and in July, she was asked to preside at the town's Human Relations Council meeting by its president. In December, Gorham and son Daryl were mentioned trying to manage the campus student newspaper amid student/administration editorial strife at FAMU.

On January 20, 1968, there was a State Bahá'í Youth Conference in Tallahassee, Florida, which elected a council to organize the April Florida Bahá'í Spring Institute; some 70 attended that racially integrated, mostly college-aged, gathering, and Recreation for the conference included areas on FSU campus. It is unstated if the Gorhams participated. In February, Gorham received a $500 for FAMU journalism from the Seven-Up Company of St. Louis, during the Interscholastic Press Workshop at FAMU, creating the "Thelma Thurston Gorham Scholarship”.

Around 1968-71, Gorham was away at the University of Minnesota, working on her PhD at least part of the time. Minding the Assassination of Martin Luther King Jr. in April, 1968, and the Assassination of Robert F. Kennedy in early June, there was a Race Unity observance in Tallahassee in June, while in August, she attended a Bahá'í summer school near Duluth. November was also a transition for Gorham, starting at the Twin Cities Opportunities Industrialization Center (TCOIC). A year later she was praised for her accomplishments there in spite of the challenges, however, she was asked to resign February 1971, a process completed by early May.

Gorham applied for a passport listing her Minneapolis address in 1970, indicating an intention to travel to some African countries, and had materials of a guided tour. At the time, the War of Attrition between Egypt and Israel was ending, so any plans of Bahá'í pilgrimage would have been in limbo. While Gorham was away from Tallahassee, the first Bahá'í Local Spiritual Assembly of Tallahassee was elected in 1970. That summer, Gorham joined the Viking Chapter of the American Business Women's Association while being listed as executive director of Twin Cities Opportunities Industrialization Center in Minneapolis, pursuing her doctorate and working as a faculty member of the University of Minnesota. Her son married in July too. In October, a conference on promoting the religion was held in Gainesville, and they chose Tallahassee for a project.

That spring, Gorham was listed as a guest lecturer with the Comparative Religions of the Twentieth Century lecture series by Dr. Henry Allen at the Community School of Jewish Studies in Minneapolis. That April, a regional Bahá'í summer school was held in Tallahassee. There is mention that Gorham undertook a Bahá'í pilgrimage by later 1971. Pictures of hers from Jerusalem and other sites still exist, including the Shrine of the Bab. At some unknown date, perhaps part of the same travel plans, she stopped to see the Wilmette Bahá'í House of Worship. There is also another undated trip, possibly around this decade, to Green Acre Bahá'í School of which pictures survive, including several with Stanwood Cobb as a very elderly man. Pictures of the Bahá'í winter school, dated January 1972, show Gorham at a Frontenac, Minnesota, state park.

=== Returning to Tallahassee ===
When Gorham returned to Tallahassee by spring 1972, she was elected to the assembly, and spoke at, and hosted, the community observance of the Martyrdom of the Báb, a central figure of the religion. In September, Gorham gave a talk for the Tallahassee Chapter of American Business Women's Association. Come January 1973, Gorham was named secretary of the Tallahassee Spiritual Assembly, though it was also as a jeopardized assembly with fewer than nine members. In March, Gorham gave a talk for the local Urban League. The Assembly was preserved, and Gorham was elected vice-chair in the new Bahá'í year. Glenford Mitchell, acting as secretary of the National Spiritual Assembly, sent a letter of appreciation for Gorham's assistance over the previous year on the Public Information Committee and for its absorption into the National Bahá'í Information Committee.

In February 1974, Gorham gave a talk at FAMU with slides of her visit to Africa and her pilgrimage. Gorham was again elected vice-chair of the assembly. Though there was no publicity at the time, in 1974, Gorham sued FAMU to be the head of the new journalism department she had long worked to build. There was some feedback that Gorham could initiate the program, but a white man should be hired with a PhD to chair the new department by a reviewer at the state level, and there was mention that she was also still working on her PhD on the life and career of Thurgood Marshall. Gorham initiated a complaint and also prepared a letter to the Regional Civil Rights Director of the Federal Department of Health, Education, and Welfare. Gorham also sought other positions in 1974. In her archives, various applications exist: a Kansas City school system application, a different position at FAMU, an application to work with the state Extension Service, and a denial letter from Florida State University as no opening existed, though she was acknowledged as "highly desirable" and "well qualified". That summer, she sent a notice to FAMU professors of an imminent academic publication of hers. Meanwhile, that fall, Gorham was among the attendees at the St. Louis National Bahá'í Conference in August, and was mentioned with the Bahá'ís holding a World Peace Day panel with Gorham in mid-September, back from the St. Louis Conference. Gorham wrote a chapter entitled "The Black Press and Pressure Groups" published in Perspectives of the Black Press edited by Henry LaBrie, III. The book was used in some college classes. A core statement of hers is that "No matter how one interprets or illustrates the interactions of the black media and its personnel with pressures in their environment, it is clear beyond the shadow of a doubt that the black press and black newsmen are sources of control as well as subjects of control.” It was also mistakenly said that she completed her PhD in 1971 from the University of Minnesota. Gorham kept a newspaper clipping describing the Leon County observance of the Birth of the Báb from October 1974, and was in a Church Women United meeting, including Bahá'ís Georgia Allen and herself (who was there representing the Urban League.) In November, Gorham helped with the observance of the Birth of Bahá'u'lláh. And in December, Gorham was also helping with the city's Human Relations Council's observance of Human Rights Day.

A student of Gorham made some news in March 1975, and Gorham arranged the internship of a student with the Dept of Commerce's new Bureau in Tallahassee. Gorham was also elected to the Bahá'í assembly, and she spoke for the observance of the Declaration of the Báb. In August, Gorham was listed among the faculty of the new FAMU Journalism Department that fall. Gorham was asked to be the convening chair of the Bahá'í district convention, at which a delegate is elected to go to the national convention. Come December, Gorham was mentioned among the Bahá'í meetings for the community observance of Human Rights Day, at an Assembly-sponsored social reception, and went on to a project in nearby Quincy.

For a US Bicentennial commentary, Gorham predicted for herself both more activity and less prominence as she focused on publishing articles. A couple of weeks later, she was at the St. James Missionary Baptist Church speaking on "Meeting Some of the Challenges of the International Women's Year" for the Women in Action for Christ group, and was elected to the Spiritual Assembly too. In September, Gorham gave a talk at the FSU Bahá'í Club's observance of World Peace Day. The Tallahassee Bahá'ís hosted the northernmost of the three regions of that year's district conventions in Florida. She also received a thank you letter from the Local Assembly of Gainesville for assisting in their efforts to present the religion to the public some time before November and a department head at Jacksonville Community College was seeking permission for a presentation on the Bahá'ís, of which Gorham was listed as one of the faculty for the fall class, and would be attempting to create a film recording of the event in her class.

In March 1977, she was visible teaching media classes at FAMU, at least some of which focused on women, and a regional Bahá'í conference included Gorham. The following April, a septuagenarian made the news in Gorham's journalism class. That June, her mother, Bertha Lee, died while living with Gorham and sister Erma. In June, Gorham was officially offered an associate professorship in the new department, a colleague of Gorham was mentioned as a columnist, and in July, Gorham was noted with the journalism department. She was given a paid year off, 1977-1978, to work on her PhD.

In February 1978, Gorham gave a workshop at FAMU on careers. This month, she also got news that many of her Minnesota University credits had been accepted for her PhD degree progress at Florida State University. In May, Gorham hosted the radio program presenting Ann Schoonmaker on the Cavalcade Radio Show for the regional Bahá'í Women's Conference at Florida State University the week preceding the Declaration of the Báb. Print coverage of the conference reached from Tallahassee to Georgia. Gorham also appeared for a talk on "Wommen in Communications" with a FSU doctoral student. FAMU and FSU were both colleges with known Bahá'í clubs that year. Gorham was signed up for two graduate-level courses with Florida State for the summer of 1978.

In 1979-1980, Gorham's salary was $17,899. In 1980, the median ('middlest') income in America was near $31,000, and near $20,000 among African-Americans. Note: Education field incomes are less than commercial rates, African-American's median income is less than that of white Americans, and women's income median is less than men's, though how these combine in the FAMU context for 1980 has not been published. In May, an update on Gorham's progress on her PhD was circulated among relevant staff by Dr. Tom W. Hoffer of Florida State University. In June, Gorham again represented the University of Minnesota at an FSU inauguration. That fall, the Thelma Thurston Gorham Merit Award for Achievement was established by the FAMU Chapter of the Society of Professional Journalists of the Department of Journalism, and the first award was given to the FAMU Student Government President. In November, Gorham spoke on the UN-designated and Bahá'í-supported International Year of the Child.

In March 1980, the Tallahassee Spiritual Assembly advertised for homefront pioneers. In April, Gorham was interviewed on TV11, and an article of her own was published in March 1981 in The Tallahassee Democrat. A couple weeks later Gorham's article profiling the Bahá'ís was published, including the Bahá'ís of Tallahassee, Leon County, Quincy, Havana, Monticello, and Perry, who together held Naw Ruz: "The Baha'is… believe that Baha'u'llah developed a religious system that will enable them to overcome their inbred divisiveness and achieve a long-awaited unity and harmony of purpose - the establishment of the kingdom of God on Earth." It was also mentioned that Adelbert C. Jones of FAMU was also a Bahá'í since 1971.

Gorham wrote another article for the Democrat, and her work on women's classes at FAMU also made the news. This year, Gorham was elected as chair of the Tallahassee Assembly, appointed as an assistant to the Auxiliary Board for the region operating under Ben Levy, who was operating under Counselors Sarah Pereira and Velma Sherrill in June, wrote an update to Levy about community activities, and she was on a panel at the National Newspaper Publisher's Association meeting in July. In August, Gorham was mentioned as presenting at a conference in her role as an assistant to the Auxiliary Board.

There is mention of, but lack of access to, a series of articles Gorham did for September 24-30, and December 10-16, 1981, entitled “Universal Truths,” on religion and faith.

In February 1982, Gorham was listed as part of a series of Bahá'í informational meetings at FAMU. In April, FAMU received word that its new Print Journalism, Broadcast Journalism and Public Relations programs for the Department of Mass Communications, of which Gorham had been a part, had been approved by the Accreditation Council on Education in Journalism and Mass Communication(ACEJMC) - the first HBCU to receive this accreditation. In May, she was a cosigner on the Equal Rights Amendment(ERA) support letter published by The Tallahassee Democrat. About then, the Ministerial Alliance of Tallahassee adopted a resolution on the plight of the Bahá'ís in Iran. Meanwhile, Gorham was elected to report for the Tallahassee Drifters, Inc. In October, Gorham helped a teacher get a grant.

In January 1983, she complained about her salary administratively, following external comments in 1982 that it was too low. This resulted in the highest raise in the department of journalism for that year, resulting in a 1983-1984 school year salary of $28,562. In June, Gorham wrote a letter to the editor on the persecution of Bahá'ís in Iran. This year, Gorham was elected vice-chair of Tallahassee Assembly. In August, she wrote again on the persecution in Iran, remarking on the deaths of teenage girl Bahá'ís in Iran "resulting from the systematic and officially sanctioned persecution of the Baha'i religious minority in Iran" and that this had made a variety of media coverage, including WFSU-TV. "Perhaps we can refuse to remain wrapped in silence, ignorant or unaware of what could happen elsewhere." In September, she was listed with the Bahá'í Club meetings and as their correspondent.

In January 1984, Gorham was on a Tony Brown panel discussion for radio WFSY. In February, entering her thirtieth year as a member of the Bahá'í Faith, Gorham gave a talk at FAMU entitled "An African-American View of the Baha'i Faith”. In October, Gorham presented a press workshop at Embry-Riddle Aeronautical University, and wrote a summary of the Bahá'í wedding which also took place in October.

== Elder ==
For 1984-5, her university salary was $28,562, and she received a raise for 1985-6 to $30,690, which may have included a raise based on a salary comparison with other staff. She also passed her PhD preliminary exams in 1984. Starting in 1985, Gorham began to be sought out to comment on topics, served on more boards, while also continuing as before, giving talks and being noted in various venues.

In February 1985, Gorham was quoted commenting on the state of journalism, and on past FAMU presidents. In March, Gorham consulted with a regional press institute conference. In April, Gorham joined the governing directors of the Miss Collegiate Black American Pageant. That year, FAMU hosted the regional Bahá'í unit convention to elect a delegate to the next National Bahá'í Convention. In November, Gorham was mentioned helping a novelist. Opening January 1986, through its first three editions, Gorham was on the editorial board of American Journalism. In April, Gorham was added to the inaugural Black Communicators Hall of Fame, with that being heralded in Miami, too. A study of The Oklahoma Eagle included interviews with Gorham in 1986 was later published. In September, Gorham was asked to comment on FAMU history, and she worked with the local Urban League magazine in early 1987. In June, she was asked by the Spiritual Assembly of the Bahá'ís of Gainsville to assist in their efforts to reach the local African American community. In August, she was among the presenters during a local teaching conference designed to look at ways to promulgate the religion in the area in August. In late 1987 the Tallahassee Bahá'ís gave The Promise of World Peace to Mayor Jack McLean, and on December 10 the Mayor and city council proclaimed Human Rights Day. That summer, she attended a Florida Folk Heritage Award ceremony by the state Bureau of Florida Folklife Programs, and as a result, was invited to a 3-day state Folklore Society Festival and a special reception they held.

In March 1988, Gorham agreed to co-represent the Division of Journalism at the April FAMU Campus honors banquet. That October, Gorham gave a FAMU workshop on classroom stress, and was asked to comment on the terminology of “African American” vs "black" - she preferred "African American".

In February 1989, Gorham served as a judge for a public speaking contest for Black History Month. In March, Gorham was among the nominations for Women in Communications Inc. Spotlight Award, and, in April, she was invited to the FAMU Presidential Scholars Association reception and fundraiser. She was also the interviewee for a newspaper article on the FAMU marching band appearing in France for their Bicentennial. The five-year sunset period of her PhD preliminary test results lapsed without enough progress towards her degree, so further work would require passing a new set of tests. In September, Gorham was co-presenter at FAMU on the Bahá'ís, listed with her own talk, and acting as the Bahá'í club contact point. In November, she spoke for the Bahá'í observance of the Birth of Bahá'u'lláh at a park and at FAMU. By then, she was also a paid-up life member of the NAACP, and a member of the Honors Committee for the Thurgood Marshall Scholarship Black Educational Fund.

In 1990, Gorham was honored with the Lifetime Achievement Award by the Women in Communication, Inc., formerly the Theta Sigma Phi honors sorority of women journalists, the organization that had asked her to leave after adopting a racist amendment in its charter document banning African Americans in the 1930s. The ban was lifted later, and, after 12 years, she rejoined the organization. Her profile noted various facts: In her 1945 coverage of the formation of the United Nations, she had signed on with eight newspapers to cover the event. Her piece for The Crisis about venereal disease at Fort Wachuca caused ire with the Fort command. She remembered her frustration at the unbalanced coverage and tone of coverage about black-skinned people in Kansas when she was growing up. And she was working on a book about African American journalists and publishers. She also won the 1990-1991 National Organization for Women's Black Woman Award by the 34th National Drifter Convention "to typify the versatility, courage and strength of a special kind of woman," with reviews of her local chapter activity, national organization actions, local community, personal and professional life, and hobbies and avocations. She was also WTXL-TV's "Citizen of the Week". The 1990 Bahá'í District Convention in Tallahassee was held at FSU.

In early 1991, Gorham agreed to serve as a judge in reading papers for the local chapter of the NAACP, and that year Gorham's sister also died in her home.

Gorham was given another profile in The Florida Flambeau in October 1991. A journalist since the 1930s, editor of many publications, children's book author, high school teacher, and public information officer. Associate editor Lauren Lustig called her "popular and nurturing" at FAMU. "I have a number of gigs I have not played." The profile noted various facts of her life:

- She still hoped to finish her PhD on Thurgood Marshall, with whom she worked at an NAACP office in the 1940s.
- She had more than 30 plaques on her office wall in 1991.
- She was known to fill out application forms and put "human" when asked for race. "God, whomever he or she may be, only made one race.”
- She was one of three black women at the University of Minnesota and the only one studying journalism, though there were other white women.
- Her first journalism job was with the Kansas City Call as a police reporter, and she rose to editor while there.
- She covered the UN during President Roosevelt's attendance, mostly on Third World policies, for 8 newspapers in the 1950s.
- Her directorship of the Opportunities Industrialization Center brought people into vocational and academic work - one rose to be a bank executive.
- Gorham believed Reagan and Bush (W) should have been impeached, but had given up on politics years earlier when she ran for the Kansas City Board of Education. She was registered as independent (unaffiliated), regularly voted, felt Justice Thomas was not qualified, called Anita Hill "weak", noting "Both were used by the white establishment."

== Posthumously ==
=== Death ===
Gorham was found dead on January 7, 1992, after missing two classes at the beginning of her semester classes at FAMU. Police officers broke into the house to find her, found her dead in her bedroom of natural causes, while under doctor's care for a heart problem, already dead for several days. She was last seen on December 31, FAMU held a memorial on January 9 at the Winterwood Theatre.

Obituaries of Gorham began to be posted, including notices of twin memorials - at the Bethel Missionary Baptist Church, and of the Bahá'ís and Alpha Kappa Alpha at the Funeral Home. The Florida Flambeau said: "Any Florida A&M University journalism student or teacher will recognize [the words] 'God didn't make black and white people. God made just one race, the human race." that often came up in conversation with Thelma Thurston Gorham. They give a sense of the wisdom Gorham gained from her years of struggling to make a name for herself in the field of journalism when the idea of a female African-American reporter was unheard of." She was listed in The American Bahá'í backdating her death to January 1. At the time, the Bahá'í community had no Center - the first came in 1997, around which the regional Baha’i population was 68 across Tallahassee, Leon County, and nearby Havana.

In Tallahassee, Gorham would have suffered through Hurricanes Dora(1964), Alma(1966), Agnes (1972), and Kate (1985).

=== Memorials ===
Memorials and testimonials began to appear quickly from local journalists and institutions. Arthur Crowell, then of Hamden, Connecticut, said of Gorham that she "singlehandedly developed the journalism curriculum to train - and more, motivate - FAMU students." FAMU gave a posthumous honorary doctorate to Gorham in April, as well as a career Meritorious Achievement Award. A scholarship in her name was established in June, and a nonprofit as well.

Other remembrances were published by further journalists across the South in the 1990s and on into the early 2000s. Around 2004, news began to be circulated about the FAMU Journalism and Mass Media Department getting its own building initially named after Gorham, about which there were some contrasting opinions. Then she was mentioned in local Black History Month events. The FAMU Journalism and Mass Media's Alumni Achievement Award in Gorham's name began to be given in 1995 and continues through 2023.

While Gorham had struggled for recognition and the opportunity for leadership in her later decades of academic service, including unheard-of raises in her salary when external interests reviewed her situation, Gorham had been praised for her decades in actual newspaper editorialship. Gorham's leading of the Apache Sentinel in the 1940s was the stand-out example given by Carlotta Bass, editor-publisher of The California Eagle: "The most radical changes in Negro journalism came about during World War II.… for the first time in history a Negro woman was editor of an Army newspaper…." Her 1954 editorial series "How Ready Are We for Integration" was the reason for an award from the then named National Conference of Jews and Christians for Brotherhood Week of February 1955 was given to her newspaper. In 1961-2 Gorham was named as part of the Bahá'í National Spiritual Assembly's first Public Information group, and officially represented the Bahá'ís of the United States at a university hosted conference amidst a panel, who also appeared on a pioneering news program co-hosted by a woman journalist. In the 1970s, though not named as leader, she helped found the first journalism program at FAMU and it went on to be the first HBCU to receive accreditation from the Council on Education in Journalism and Mass Communication's committee for accreditation (ACEJMC). Whatever the Gale group had in mind, their biography notes: "Up until the early 1980s, she was the most exciting black female journalist in the country." and "By the early 1980s she was still listed as one of only fifteen black women to finish (their education attaining degrees) from major universities belonging to the American Association of Schools and Departments of Journalism." She was posthumously granted the PhD that is most often talked about as to why she was not named head of the new FAMU school that included journalism, as well as a career Meritorious Achievement Award.

From a Bahá'í perspective, her time in Tulsa, and Tallahassee, the Bahá'í community went from her as the isolated adult went on to the milestones of hosting an assembly, albeit first elected without her living there, and then rising to hosting a Center, and ongoing activities. In some fashion, if the worldwide community was growing, it would have grown without her. Yet it did, and with her. In Velda Piff Metelmann's 1997 biography Lua Getsinger, she details that there was a practice in the era around 1915 of naming “mothers” of regions and communities, sporadically done in other times, though this practice generally ended. It may be that Gorham deserves this title "mother" for the Tulsa and Tallahassee Bahá'í communities; that's up to them.

=== Estate ===
There was an Estate auction of her materials announced in July 2002, which was acquired as the Gorham Collection at the Museum in the Library of Tallahassee Community College (TCC).

Her son died on October 22, 2009, and her granddaughter pre-deceased him between 1992 and 2009.

On what would have been her 100th birthday, in 2012, the Bahá'ís of Tallahassee held a memorial with presenters Keith Miles, FAMU radio station manager, and James Hawkins, Dean of Journalism and Mass Media at FAMU.

== Archives ==
- Darnell, Laura (October 2024). "Thelma Thurston Gorham Collection (AC110)" (PDF). The Black Archives of Mid-America.
- "Thelma T. Gorham Collection". RileyArchives.org. Tallahassee, Florida.: John G. Riley House Archives, Tallahassee Community College Library. 2024.
