= Birth of Baháʼu'lláh =

Baháʼí religious observance; birthday of Baháʼu'lláh

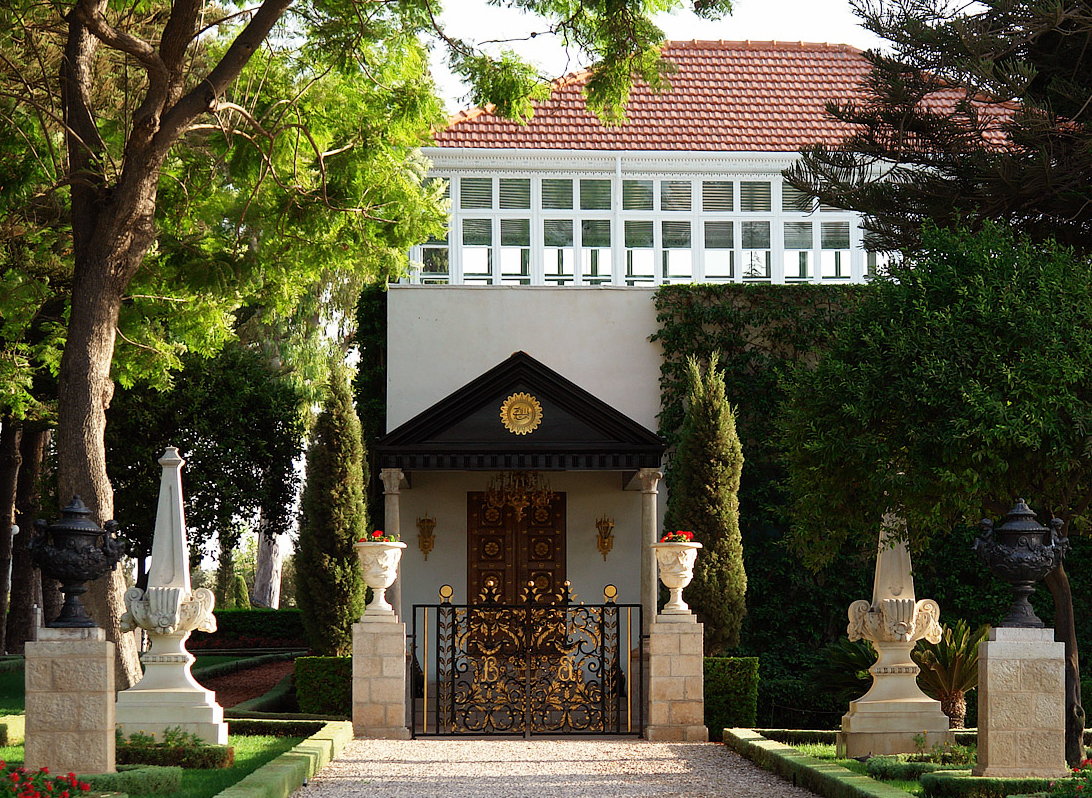
- The Shrine of Baháʼu'lláh, Bahjí, Israel
- Observed by: Followers of the Baháʼí Faith
- Type: Baháʼí
- Date: Second day after the eighth new moon following Baháʼí Naw-Rúz
- Related to: Twin Holy Birthdays

The Birth of Baháʼu'lláh is one of nine holy days in the Baháʼí calendar that is celebrated by adherents of the Baháʼí Faith and during which work is suspended. The holy day celebrates the birth of Baháʼu'lláh, the founder of the Baháʼí Faith. The 2024 date is November 3.

Bahá'u'lláh was born on 12 November 1817 in Tehran, Iran, and this holy day was instituted in the Kitáb-i-Aqdas, his book of laws, where Baháʼu'lláh first refers to four great festivals: the Festival of Ridván, the Declaration of the Báb, the birth of the Báb—who is considered to be a Manifestation of God, and who foretold the coming of Baháʼu'lláh—and the birth of Baháʼu'lláh. In questions submitted to Baháʼu'lláh after writing the Kitáb-i-Aqdas, Baháʼu'lláh states that the two days commemorating the births of the Báb and Baháʼu'lláh are seen to be one in the "sight of God" and are referred to as the "Twin Birthdays".

ʻAbdu'l-Bahá, the son of Baháʼu'lláh, stated that during the holy day the community should rejoice together to increase the unity of the community. Baháʼís usually observe the holy day with community gatherings where prayers are shared and the birth of Baháʼu'lláh is celebrated. Baháʼu'lláh stated that in communities where the majority of the population are Shiʻa Muslims, such as Iran, his followers should exercise caution in celebrating the twin birthdays so that they do not upset the majority of the population who are mourning during the Islamic month of Muharram.

In the Islamic calendar, which is a lunar calendar, the two holy days fall on consecutive days: the birth of the Báb is on the first day of Muharram in 1235 AH (20 October 1819), and the birth of Baháʼu'lláh is on the second day of Muharram in 1233 AH (12 November 1817). Baháʼu'lláh stated that if the holy days occur during the Baháʼí month of fasting, Baháʼís need not observe the fast those days.

Since the Baháʼí calendar is a solar calendar, the decision to celebrate the Twin Holy Birthdays in a solar or lunar basis remains to the Universal House of Justice. Until March 20, 2015, in most of the world, the holy day was celebrated according to the solar year on 12 November, and the birth of the Báb was celebrated on 20 October. Since days in the Baháʼí calendar start at sunset, the holy day started on the evening of 11 November and proceeded until sunset on 12 November.

However, in 2014, the Universal House of Justice decided to celebrate the twin holy days on the first and second day following the eighth new moon after Naw-Rúz, starting from March 20, 2015 onwards. Thus from March 20, 2015 onward the day where the Birth of Baháʼu'lláh is celebrated will change from year to year.

Holy Days of the Baháʼí calendar
Year	Naw-Rúz	1st day of Ridván	9th day of Ridván	12th day of Ridván	Declaration of the Báb	Ascension of Bahá'u'lláh	Martyrdom of the Báb	Birth of the Báb	Birth of Bahá'u'lláh	Day of the Covenant	Ascension of ʻAbdu'l-Bahá
2024	20 Mar	20 Apr	28 Apr	1 May	23 May	28 May	9 Jul	2 Nov	3 Nov	25 Nov	27 Nov
2025	20 Mar	20 Apr	28 Apr	1 May	23 May	28 May	9 Jul	22 Oct	23 Oct	25 Nov	27 Nov
2026	21 Mar	21 Apr	29 Apr	2 May	24 May	29 May	10 Jul	10 Nov	11 Nov	26 Nov	28 Nov
2027	21 Mar	21 Apr	29 Apr	2 May	24 May	29 May	10 Jul	30 Oct	31 Oct	26 Nov	28 Nov
2028	20 Mar	20 Apr	28 Apr	1 May	23 May	28 May	9 Jul	19 Oct	20 Oct	25 Nov	27 Nov
2029	20 Mar	20 Apr	28 Apr	1 May	23 May	28 May	9 Jul	7 Nov	8 Nov	25 Nov	27 Nov
2030	20 Mar	20 Apr	28 Apr	1 May	23 May	28 May	9 Jul	28 Oct	29 Oct	25 Nov	27 Nov
2031	21 Mar	21 Apr	29 Apr	2 May	24 May	29 May	10 Jul	17 Oct	18 Oct	26 Nov	28 Nov
