= Twin Holy Birthdays =

Baháʼí religious observance

- Observed by: the Baháʼí Faith
- Type: Baháʼí
- Date: First and second day after the eighth new moon following Baháʼí Naw-Rúz

The Festivals of the Twin Birthdays or the Twin Holy Birthdays refers to two successive holy days in the Baháʼí calendar that celebrate the births of two central figures of the Baháʼí Faith. The two holy days are the birth of the Báb on the first day of Muharram in the Islamic calendar (20 October 1819) and the birth of Baháʼu'lláh on the second day of Muharram (two years prior, on 12 November 1817).

== Observance ==
They are observed on the first and the second day following the occurrence of the eighth new moon after Naw-Rúz, as determined in advance by astronomical tables using Tehran as the point of reference. This results in the observance of the Twin Birthdays moving, year to year, within the months of Mashíyyat, ʻIlm, and Qudrat of the Baháʼí calendar, or from mid-October to mid-November in the Gregorian calendar.

=== Ancient traditions ===
Prior to 2015 and a decision by the Universal House of Justice, these two holy days had been observed on the first and second days of Muharram in the Islamic lunar calendar in the Middle East, while other countries observed them according to the Gregorian calendar on 20 October (for the birth of the Báb) and 12 November (for the birth of Baháʼu'lláh).

=== Special celebrations ===
On the occasion of the 200th anniversaries of the births of the Báb and Baháʼu'lláh in 2017 and 2019, special celebrations were organized worldwide. In October 2017 the Universal House of Justice sent a letter to "all who celebrate the Glory of God", on the meaning of Baháʼu'lláh's life and current Baháʼí activities, inspired by the 200th anniversary of his birth.

== Dates ==
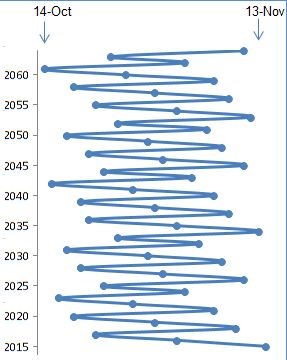
Chart showing the fluctuations of the eighth new moon after Naw-Rúz (Baháʼí new year) marking the date of the Twin Holy Birthdays in the Baháʼí calendar, between 172 and 221 B.E. (2015–2065).

Days in the Baha'i calendar begin at sunset. In the following table, the Baha'i date should be understood as starting at sunset on the day before the first Gregorian date listed for each year.

Holy Days of the Baháʼí calendar
Year	Naw-Rúz	1st day of Ridván	9th day of Ridván	12th day of Ridván	Declaration of the Báb	Ascension of Bahá'u'lláh	Martyrdom of the Báb	Birth of the Báb	Birth of Bahá'u'lláh	Day of the Covenant	Ascension of ʻAbdu'l-Bahá
2024	20 Mar	20 Apr	28 Apr	1 May	23 May	28 May	9 Jul	2 Nov	3 Nov	25 Nov	27 Nov
2025	20 Mar	20 Apr	28 Apr	1 May	23 May	28 May	9 Jul	22 Oct	23 Oct	25 Nov	27 Nov
2026	21 Mar	21 Apr	29 Apr	2 May	24 May	29 May	10 Jul	10 Nov	11 Nov	26 Nov	28 Nov
2027	21 Mar	21 Apr	29 Apr	2 May	24 May	29 May	10 Jul	30 Oct	31 Oct	26 Nov	28 Nov
2028	20 Mar	20 Apr	28 Apr	1 May	23 May	28 May	9 Jul	19 Oct	20 Oct	25 Nov	27 Nov
2029	20 Mar	20 Apr	28 Apr	1 May	23 May	28 May	9 Jul	7 Nov	8 Nov	25 Nov	27 Nov
2030	20 Mar	20 Apr	28 Apr	1 May	23 May	28 May	9 Jul	28 Oct	29 Oct	25 Nov	27 Nov
2031	21 Mar	21 Apr	29 Apr	2 May	24 May	29 May	10 Jul	17 Oct	18 Oct	26 Nov	28 Nov

== Significance ==
The notion of "twin Manifestations of God" is a concept fundamental to Baháʼí belief, describing the relationship between the Báb and Baháʼu'lláh. Both are considered Manifestations of God in their own right, having each founded separate religions (Bábism and the Baháʼí Faith) and revealed their own holy scriptures. To Baháʼís, however, the missions of the Báb and Baháʼu'lláh are inextricably linked: The Báb's mission was to prepare the way for the coming of Him whom God shall make manifest, who eventually appeared in the person of Baháʼu'lláh. For this reason, both the Báb and Baháʼu'lláh are revered as central figures of the Baháʼí Faith. A parallel is made between Baháʼu'lláh and the Báb as between Jesus and John the Baptist.

In the Kitáb-i-Aqdas, Baháʼu'lláh wrote that his birthday and that of the Báb "are accounted as one in the sight of God".
