= Day of the Covenant =

Day of the Covenant may refer to:

- Day of the Vow, a public Christian holiday in South Africa
- Day of the Covenant (Baháʼí), a holy day for the Baháʼí Faith
