= Baháʼí holy days =

Holy days in the Baháʼí Calendar:

The Baháʼí Faith has eleven holy days, which are important anniversaries in the history of the religion. On nine of these holy days, work is suspended. There is no fixed format for any of the holy days, and Baháʼí communities organize their own commemorative meetings.

All but two of the holy days are scheduled annually on fixed dates in the Baháʼí calendar. The Twin Holy Birthdays are scheduled annually according to a lunar calculation.

Besides the eleven holy days, Baháʼís also celebrate Ayyám-i-Há, a period of several extra days in the calendar (followed by the Nineteen Day Fast).

== Table of dates ==
Holy Days of the Baháʼí calendar
Year	Naw-Rúz	1st day of Ridván	9th day of Ridván	12th day of Ridván	Declaration of the Báb	Ascension of Bahá'u'lláh	Martyrdom of the Báb	Birth of the Báb	Birth of Bahá'u'lláh	Day of the Covenant	Ascension of ʻAbdu'l-Bahá
2024	20 Mar	20 Apr	28 Apr	1 May	23 May	28 May	9 Jul	2 Nov	3 Nov	25 Nov	27 Nov
2025	20 Mar	20 Apr	28 Apr	1 May	23 May	28 May	9 Jul	22 Oct	23 Oct	25 Nov	27 Nov
2026	21 Mar	21 Apr	29 Apr	2 May	24 May	29 May	10 Jul	10 Nov	11 Nov	26 Nov	28 Nov
2027	21 Mar	21 Apr	29 Apr	2 May	24 May	29 May	10 Jul	30 Oct	31 Oct	26 Nov	28 Nov
2028	20 Mar	20 Apr	28 Apr	1 May	23 May	28 May	9 Jul	19 Oct	20 Oct	25 Nov	27 Nov
2029	20 Mar	20 Apr	28 Apr	1 May	23 May	28 May	9 Jul	7 Nov	8 Nov	25 Nov	27 Nov
2030	20 Mar	20 Apr	28 Apr	1 May	23 May	28 May	9 Jul	28 Oct	29 Oct	25 Nov	27 Nov
2031	21 Mar	21 Apr	29 Apr	2 May	24 May	29 May	10 Jul	17 Oct	18 Oct	26 Nov	28 Nov

Holy Days
Name	Date on the Bahá'í calendar	Number of Days after Naw-Rúz	Usual date on the Gregorian Calendar Naw-Rúz 20 March/Naw-Rúz 21 March	Special time of celebration or commemoration	Work Suspended
Naw-Rúz (Baháʼí New Year)	Bahá 1		March 20/21	-	Yes
First day of Riḍván	Jalál 13	31	April 20/21	3 p.m. (Standard Time)	Yes
Ninth day of Riḍván	Jamál 2	39	April 28/29	-	Yes
Twelfth day of Riḍván	Jamál 5	42	May 1/2	-	Yes
Declaration of the Báb	ʻAẓamat 8	64	May 23/24	2 hours after sunset on preceding day	Yes
Ascension of Baháʼu'lláh	ʻAẓamat 13	69	May 28/29	3 a.m. (Standard Time)	Yes
Martyrdom of the Báb	Raḥmat 17	111	July 9/10	12 noon	Yes
Birth of the Báb	First of the Twin Holy Birthdays; celebrated on the first day after the eighth new moon following Naw-Rúz (mid-October to mid-November)			-	Yes
Birth of Baháʼu'lláh	Second of the Twin Holy Birthdays; celebrated on the second day after the eighth new moon following Naw-Rúz (mid-October to mid-November)			-	Yes
Day of the Covenant	Qawl 4	250	November 25/26	-	No
Ascension of ʻAbdu'l-Bahá	Qawl 6	252	November 27/28	1 a.m. (Standard Time)	No

=== Historical dates ===
Historical dates, as celebrated in the west before March 21, 2015
Name	Gregorian Dates
Naw-Rúz (Baháʼí New Year)	March 21
First day of Riḍván	April 21
Ninth day of Riḍván	April 29
Twelfth day of Riḍván	May 2
Declaration of the Báb	May 24
Ascension of Baháʼu'lláh	May 29
Martyrdom of the Báb	July 10
Birth of the Báb	October 20
Birth of Baháʼu'lláh	November 12
Day of the Covenant	November 26
Ascension of ʻAbdu'l-Bahá	November 28

== Holy Days of the Bahá’í calendar ==
=== General holy days ===
==== Naw-Rúz ====
Annually on Bahá 1. Naw-Rúz marks the beginning of spring.

=== Holy days associated with the Báb ===
==== The Birth of the Báb ====
Annually in October or November. The Báb was born two years after Baháʼu'lláh, on the first of the Twin Holy Birthdays.

==== Declaration of the Báb ====
Annually on ʻAẓamat 8. See Declaration of the Bab to Mullá Husayn

==== Martyrdom of the Báb ====
Annually on Raḥmat 17. See Martyrdom of the Báb

=== Holy days associated with Baháʼu'lláh ===
==== The Birth of Baháʼu'lláh ====
Annually in October or November. Baháʼu'lláh was born on the second of the Twin Holy Birthdays. See also: Birth of Baháʼu'lláh.

==== Festival of Ridván ====
The Festival of Ridván, a twelve-day festival that commemorates Baháʼu'lláh's announcement to be the Manifestation of God, is the most holy Baháʼí festival to which Baháʼu'lláh referred as the "Most Great Festival." The first, ninth and twelfth days of the festival are celebrated as holy days.

Annually on Jalál 13, Jamál 2 and Jamál 5.

See Festival of Ridván.

==== Ascension of Baháʼu'lláh ====
Annually on ʻAẓamat 13.

=== Holy days associated with ʻAbdu'l-Bahá ===
On these two holy days, the suspension of work is not required.

==== Day of the Covenant ====
Annually on Qawl 4. See Day of the Covenant

==== Ascension of ʻAbdu'l-Bahá ====
Annually on Qawl 6. See Ascension of ʻAbdu'l-Bahá

=== Twin Holy Birthdays ===
The Twin Holy Birthdays of the Báb and Baháʼu'lláh are celebrated on the first and second day following the eighth new moon after Naw-Rúz. (In the Islamic lunar calendar, the births of the Báb and Baháʼu'lláh fell on consecutive days - the first and second day of Muharram, respectively, two years apart.)

See Twin Holy Birthdays and Birth of Baháʼu'lláh.

== See also ==
- Baháʼí calendar
