= National Cancer Survivors Day =

Secular holiday in the United States

- Logo of the National Cancer Survivors Day Foundation
- Observed by: Mainly people in the United States
- Celebrations: Parades and local observation
- Date: First Sunday in June
- 2024 date: June 2
- 2025 date: June 1
- 2026 date: June 7
- 2027 date: June 6
- Frequency: annual

National Cancer Survivors Day is a secular holiday celebrated on the first Sunday in June primarily in the United States of America. The day is meant to "demonstrate that life after a cancer diagnosis can be a reality". Though it is mainly celebrated in the United States, the National Cancer Survivors Day Foundation is attempting to grow its popularity in other parts of the world, with some success.

== History ==
The National Cancer Survivors Day was first announced by Merril Hastings at the second national conference meeting of the National Coalition for Cancer Survivorship in Albuquerque, New Mexico, on November 20, 1987. Later, Hastings filed the name as an International Class 042 Service, as well as registering with the United States Patent and Trademark Office in the name of Pulse Publications.

The first National Cancer Survivors Day was held on June 5, 1988.

== Events ==
Local towns, cities, hospitals, and support groups usually host events and celebrations on National Cancer Survivors Day. Celebrations can include parades, carnivals, art exhibits, contests, and testimonies to honor local cancer survivors.

The 2008 celebration included a commencement by U.S. President George W. Bush and the National Cancer Institute director.

Antigua and Barbuda have included a walk and run as part of their celebrations since 2007.

== Expansion ==
The National Cancer Survivors Day Foundation is attempting to expand the holidays celebrations worldwide, with some limited success. Countries targeted include Canada, the Cayman Islands, Antigua, Trinidad, Tobago, Saint Lucia, Italy, The Netherlands, India, Malaysia, Guam. Australia, South Africa, and the American Samoa.

== Sponsoring corporations ==
Frequent sponsors of the National Cancer Survivors Day include AstraZeneca, COPING Magazine, Lilly Oncology, and the R.A. Bloch Cancer Foundation.
