= Nanomonestotse =

Native American celebration

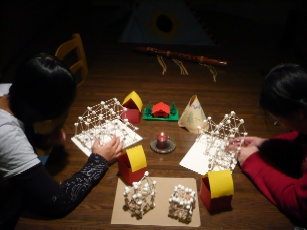
Building houses for the Nanomonestotse village.

Nanomonestotse is an autumn celebration of peace, observed within some Native American families. The word "nanomónestôtse" (pronounced NAH-noh-MAH-nay-STOHT-say) means "peace" in the Cheyenne language.

== History and traditions ==
Nanomonestotse traces its roots back to the early 1900s and a Native American woman named Marion Young, who is credited with passing the ideals of peace on to her descendants. Nanomonestotse Preparation begins on the third Monday of October. Nanomonestotse Celebration begins on the following Friday.

=== Preparation ===
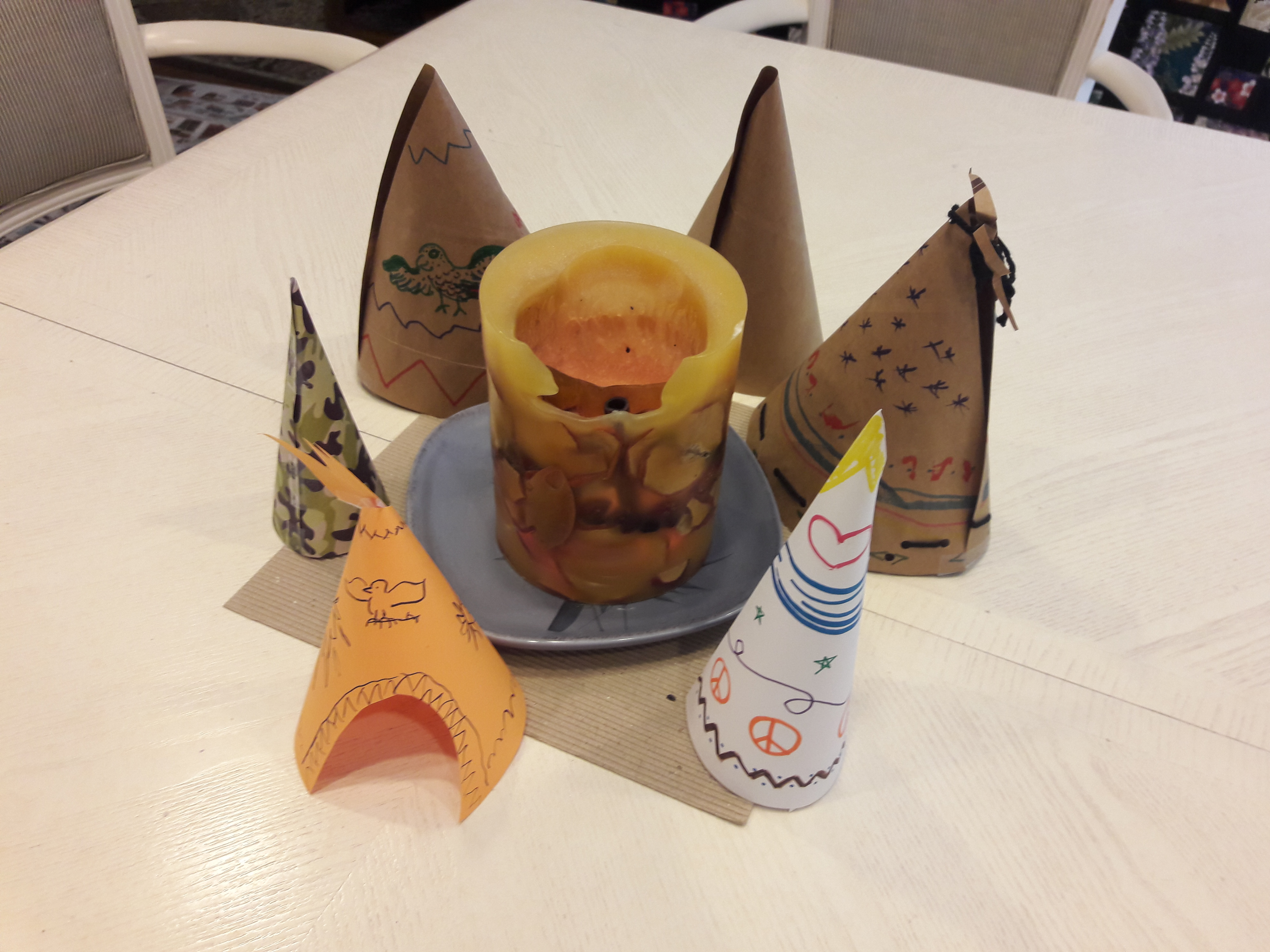
Model dwellings around a central candle in a Nanomonestotse village.

Starting on Monday, family members begin several days of preparation for the celebration at the end of the week. Children build small models of traditional Native American dwellings. Adults spend time in self-reflection. They discuss how their economic activity can better help others. They try to identify and reduce aspects of their lives that might harm others. All family members help prepare for the celebration meal.

=== Celebration ===
Starting on Friday at the end of this week, the family has a Nanomonestotse Celebration meal. Most families celebrate on Friday, but others celebrate Saturday or Sunday if that is more convenient. Healthy food is served at the meal. The model houses are arranged around a candle as a centerpiece on the table. Families often invite some neighbors to join them for the meal.

The meal often features foods native to the Americas, such as corn, peanuts, sweet potatoes, chili peppers, cranberries, pumpkin and squash. In northern latitudes, First Nations tribes often celebrate this communal holiday with a pemmican feast or festival.

During the week, friends and families greet other saying: "May peace dwell in our village."
