= International Client's Day =

Unofficial observance, 19 March

- Official name: International Client's day
- Also called: Client's Day
- Type: International
- Date: 19 March
- Next time: 19 March 2027
- Frequency: Annual

International Client's Day is an unofficial holiday during which managers and entrepreneurs express gratitude to their clients. Client's Day is celebrated each year on 19 March.

Traditionally, on Client's Day customers are rewarded with discounts, special offers, and all other kinds of gifts. The day is supported by telecommunication companies, banks, retail stores, government organizations, education institutions and other businesses from all over the world. The popularity and importance of Client's Day is growing year by year, and more organizations are joining the day.

== International Client's Day history ==
The first Client's Day was celebrated in 2010. Its authors were Lithuanian and Russian business people. The main initiator of the holiday was Lithuanian entrepreneur Filip Borcov.

The idea behind Client's Day is that, while the world has many memorable days, there is no day dedicated to clients—the most valuable part of any business or organization. In 2020, the Seimas of the Republic of Lithuania was voting for Client's Day to be added to Lithuanian Memorial days list. Borcov participated in the Seimas, advocating for the idea. His main arguments were that Client's Day held cultural significance for Lithuania as a way to make the country more known to the rest of the world.

The idea was supported by 57 members of the Seimas of the Republic of Lithuania, with significant support from the Lithuanian Farmers and Greens Union political party.

== International Client's Day song ==
The official International Client's Day song was composed in 2017. The song is played to bring the celebration mood and make clients smile. Companies use this song to greet their customers and for preparing video congratulations, flash mobs, or dance shows. The song initially had an English version, but translations in Lithuanian and Russian were added in 2019. In the same year, the first official music video titled "Your dreams come Client's day. 19th of March" was launched. The video represents the main holiday idea—to make every client feel special and happy.
