= Takengei =

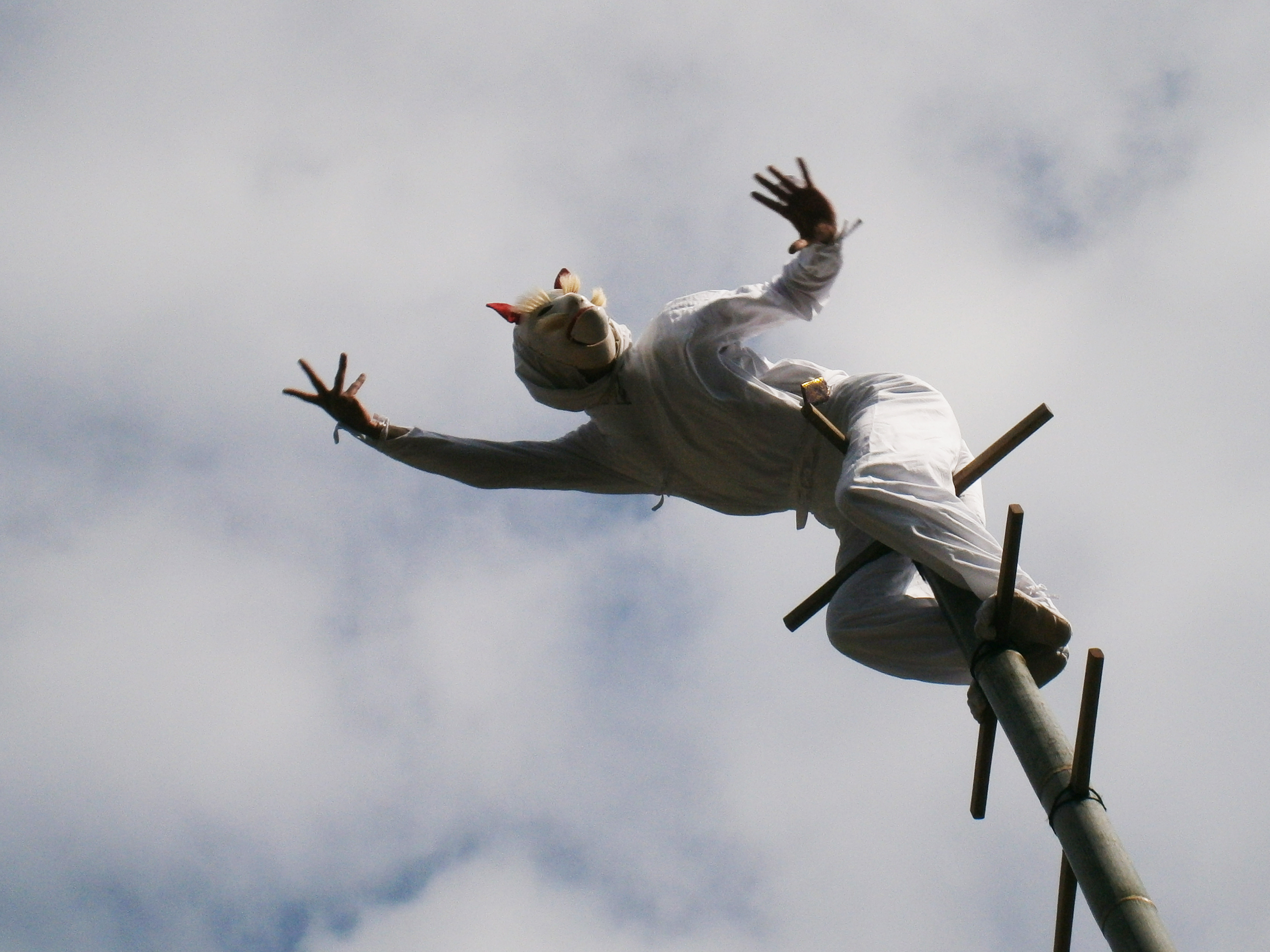
Takengei Festival, 2013

Takengei (竹ン芸) is a Japanese autumn festival performance. It is currently held in the Wakamiya Inari Jinja shrine in Nagasaki City. Since 2003, it is officially registered as part of Japan’s Folk Intangible Patrimony.

Takengei is an annual two-day event organized on October 14 and 15. Two 10 meters high bamboo poles are erected inside the sanctuary; they are called “male bamboo” (男竹) and “female bamboo” (女竹). Accompanied by traditional drums, flutes and shamisen, two people in white garb and with a kitsune mask climb up the poles and declare to each other their love at the top of the bamboos. They also accomplish some kind of acrobatic performance.

At the end, the fox at the top of the male bamboo throws around some small rice cakes (mochi), pulls out of a pocket in his garb a chicken and lets it fly to the ground. Eventually both foxes go down the poles with a spectacular slide.

== History ==
The festival was first performed in 1820, and dedicated by the Yaoyamachi (八百屋町) locality to Nagasaki Kunchi, held at Suwa Shrine. Performances continued annually until a major fire destroyed much of Suwa Shrine in 1856. After a dedication ceremony on November 24, 1896, Takengei has been dedicated to Wakamiya-Inari-Jinja, and continues to be performed every year in October.
