= Nineteen-Day Fast =

Period observed by the Baháʼí Faith

Key dates of the Baháʼí calendar
Year	Ayyám-i-Há		Fast		Naw-Rúz
2024	26 Feb	29 Feb	1 Mar	19 Mar	20 Mar
2025	25 Feb	28 Feb	1 Mar	19 Mar	20 Mar
2026	25 Feb	1 Mar	2 Mar	20 Mar	21 Mar
2027	26 Feb	1 Mar	2 Mar	20 Mar	21 Mar
2028	26 Feb	29 Feb	1 Mar	19 Mar	20 Mar
2029	25 Feb	28 Feb	1 Mar	19 Mar	20 Mar
2030	25 Feb	28 Feb	1 Mar	19 Mar	20 Mar
2031	25 Feb	1 Mar	2 Mar	20 Mar	21 Mar

Adherents of the Baháʼí Faith observe a sunrise-to-sunset fast annually for the nineteen days of the Baháʼí month of Loftiness. The practice is regarded as one of the most significant obligations of a Baháʼí, along with daily obligatory prayers. There are several exemptions to the fast, such as pregnancy or illness, and it only applies to those 15 to 70 years old.

The nineteen-day fast was instituted by the Báb, a central figure of the religion. It was later affirmed by Baháʼu'lláh, the founder, and explained in his Kitáb-i-Aqdas. The purpose of the fast is to practice abstinence from carnal desires, rejuvenate one's inner spiritual life, and bring to mind the deprivation experienced by prophets.

The nineteen days of fasting occur immediately after Ayyam-i-Ha, the four or five intercalary days of the Baháʼí calendar dedicated to prepare for the upcoming month of restraint. The fast concludes at the festival of Naw Ruz, on the vernal equinox (20–21 March, depending on the year).

For 2026, the fast begins at sunset on Sunday, March 1 and ends on sunset on Friday, March 20.

== History ==
The Báb, the founder of the Bábí Faith, instituted the Badíʻ calendar with 19 months of 19 days in his book the Persian Bayán, and stated that the last month would be a period of fasting. The Báb stated that the true significance of the fast was abstaining from all except the love of the Messengers from God. The Báb also stated that the continuation of the fast was contingent on the approval of a messianic figure, Him Whom God Shall Make Manifest. Baháʼu'lláh, the founder of the Baháʼí Faith, who claimed to be the one foretold by the Báb, accepted the fast but altered many of its details and regulations.

The Baháʼí fast resembles fasting practices of several other religions. Lent is a period of fasting for Christians, Yom Kippur and many other holidays for Jews, and the fast of Ramadan is practiced by Muslims. The Baháʼí fasting most resembles the fast of Ramadan, except that the period of fasting is defined as a fixed Baháʼí month. In contrast, Muslims fast during a lunar month, whose specific Gregorian dates vary yearly.

== Definition ==
Baháʼu'lláh established the guidelines of the fast in the Kitáb-i-Aqdas, his book of laws. Fasting is observed from sunrise to sunset during the Baháʼí month of ʻAlaʼ (between 1/2 March through 19/20 March), and it is the complete abstention from food, and drink. Observing the fast is an individual obligation and is binding on all Baháʼís who have reached the age of 15 until the age of 70; it is not enforceable by the Baháʼí administrative institutions. Various exemptions are given to the sick, the travelling, and others (see below).

While Baháʼís are allowed to fast at other times during the year, fasting at other times is not encouraged and is rarely done; Baháʼu'lláh permitted the making of vows to fast, which was a Muslim practice, but he stated that he preferred that such vows be "directed to such objectives as will profit mankind."

== Spiritual nature ==
Along with obligatory prayer, it is one of the greatest obligations of a Baháʼí. It is intended to bring the person closer to God. Shoghi Effendi, the head of the Baháʼí Faith in the first half of the 20th century, explains that the fast "is essentially a period of meditation and prayer, of spiritual recuperation, during which the believer must strive to make the necessary readjustments in his inner life, and to refresh and reinvigorate the spiritual forces latent in his soul. Its significance and purpose are, therefore, fundamentally spiritual in character. Fasting is symbolic, and a reminder of abstinence from selfish and carnal desires."

== Laws concerning fasting ==
There are laws and practices associated with the Nineteen Day Fast that Baháʼu'lláh established in the Kitáb-i-Aqdas, his book of laws.

- The period of fasting begins with the termination of the Intercalary Days and ends with the festival of Naw-Rúz.
- Abstinence from food, drink, and smoking from sunrise to sunset.
- Fasting is obligatory for men and women once they attain the age of 15.
- If one eats unconsciously during fasting, this is not breaking the fast as it is an accident.
- In regions of extremely high latitude where day and night duration varies considerably, the fast times are fixed by the clock.
- Missed days of fasting are not required to be made up later.
- There is no mention of abstention from sexual relations while fasting.

Although this is not an explicit law, fast participants should refrain from profane language and gossiping. The faith believes gossiping damages all the souls involved.

=== Exemptions from fasting ===
Various exemptions are provided in the Kitáb-i-Aqdas from the obligation of fasting. However, one meeting the exemptions may still choose to fast if they so wish, except for the ill. Baha'u'llah has stated that in "time of ill health it is not permissible to observe these obligations..." The Universal House of Justice has counseled the Baha'is that the decision of whether or not to observe an applicable exemption should be made with wisdom, keeping in mind that the exemptions were set down with good reason. Regarding those engaged in heavy labour, Baha'u'llah has stated, "[I]t is most commendable and fitting to eat with frugality and in private."

- Those who are ill.
- Those who are younger than 15 or older than 70.
- Those who are engaged in heavy labour.
- Women who are pregnant.
- Women who are nursing.
- Women who are menstruating (instead they must perform an ablution and recite the verse Glorified be God, the Lord of Splendour and Beauty 95 times a day).

Exemptions are also given to those travelling during the fast. Exemptions are granted when the travel is longer than 9 hours (or 2 hours if travelling by foot). If the traveller breaks their journey for more than nineteen days, they are only exempt from fasting for the first three days. Also, if they return home, they must begin fasting right away.

== See also ==
- Baháʼí laws
- Health effects of fasting
