= Execution of the Báb =

History of the Bahá'í Faith

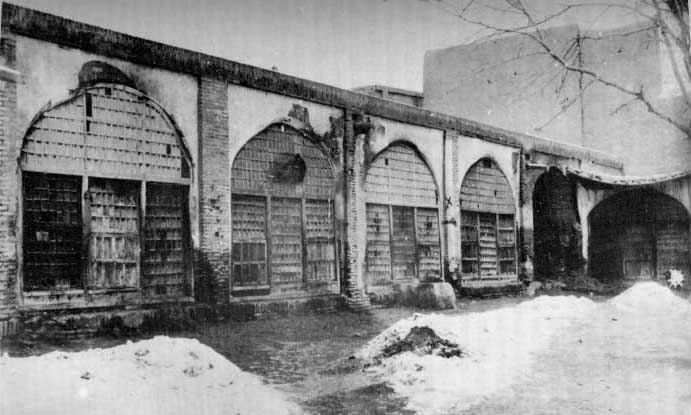
The barrack square in Tabriz, where the Báb was executed. A pillar on the center-right of the photograph, marked with an X, is the precise location where the Báb was shot.

On the morning of 9 July 1850 in Tabriz, a Persian merchant known as the Báb was charged with apostasy and shot by order of the Prime Minister of the Persian Empire. The events surrounding his execution have been the subject of controversy among researchers, and are regarded as miraculous by followers of the Baháʼí Faith, who consider him to be a Manifestation of God. The Báb and one of his companions were suspended on a wall and a large firing squad prepared to shoot. When the smoke cleared after the first volleys of bullets, the Báb was missing; reports continue by stating that the Báb was found back in his prison cell finishing dictation to his secretary. Sources, which include Persian and European reports, give a variety of accounts of varying degrees of miraculousness. All agree that he survived the first firing squad, and was killed by the second.

For many years after his death, the remains of the Báb were secretly transferred from place to place until they were brought to their final resting place at the Shrine of the Báb in Haifa on the middle terrace of the Baháʼí Gardens. The anniversary of the Báb's martyrdom is commemorated by members of the Baháʼí Faith at noon on Rahmat 16 (Sharaf) of the Baháʼí calendar, corresponding to 9 or 10 July. It is one of nine Holy Days when work is suspended.

== Execution order ==
In 1850 a new prime minister, Amir Kabir, ordered the execution of the Báb. He was brought to Tabriz, where he would be killed by a firing squad. His transfer to the barracks was marked by public humiliation: before the execution, he was deprived of visible signs of his status as a siyyid. The night before his execution, as he was being conducted to his cell, a young man, Anís, threw himself at the feet of the Báb, wanting to be killed with the Báb. He was immediately arrested and placed in the same cell as the Báb. Anís was Mírzá Muḥammad-ʻAlíy-i-Zunúzí, who chose to remain with the Báb despite efforts by relatives to persuade him to recant. On the morning of 9 July 1850, the Báb was taken to the Tabriz courtyard filled with nearly ten thousand people wishing to watch his execution. The Báb and Anís were suspended on a wall and a firing squad prepared to shoot. The public execution may have been intended to show the authority of the state and to forestall rumors that the Báb had survived.

== Baháʼí account ==
Hasan M. Balyuzi, a prominent Iranian member of the Baháʼí Faith, gives the prevailing Baháʼí account of the event in his biography of the Báb. Sam Khan, who bore no ill will toward the Báb, was ordered to carry out the execution. The Báb and his disciple were suspended from a wall by ropes from a nail and then fired upon by 750 troops from Sam Khan's Armenian regiment. When the gun smoke cleared, the Báb was missing and the disciple remained unharmed. The Báb was found in the room he had been housed in the night; he was finishing a conversation with his assistant that had been interrupted earlier in the day. After the conversation was complete, the Báb invited the farrash-bashi (attendant or footman) to carry out the execution; the terrified farrash-bashi abandoned their post instead. Sam Khan considered his duty fulfilled and refused to try again. A new firing squad was formed by Aqa Jan Khan-i-Khamsih's Nasiri regiment. The second execution attempt, with the Báb and his disciple suspended from the wall again, was successful. Ghaemmaghami similarly describes the first volley as having cut the ropes without killing the Báb, who was later found in the room where he had been held. A second firing squad, commanded by Áqá Ján Khán-i-Khamsih, then carried out the execution of both the Báb and Anís. Some accounts report larger numbers of soldiers than the commonly cited figure of 750.

== Remains and burial ==
After the execution, the remains of the Báb and Anís were secretly recovered and eventually transferred to Tehran. They were later moved, under the direction of Baháʼu'lláh and ʻAbdu'l-Bahá, to Ottoman Palestine, and were interred by ʻAbdu'l-Bahá on Mount Carmel in Haifa in March 1909. The superstructure of the Shrine of the Báb was completed in 1953.

== Observances ==
Martyrdom of the Báb
- Observed by: Baháʼí Faith
- Type: Religious
- Date: 9 or 10 July
- Frequency: annual

The Báb is regarded as a martyr by the followers of the Baháʼí Faith, and the anniversary of his execution is annually observed. The day corresponds to 9 or 10 July on the international Gregorian calendar.

Holy Days of the Baháʼí calendar
| Year | Naw-Rúz | 1st day of Ridván | 9th day of Ridván | 12th day of Ridván | Declaration of the Báb | Ascension of Bahá'u'lláh | Martyrdom of the Báb | Birth of the Báb | Birth of Bahá'u'lláh | Day of the Covenant | Ascension of ʻAbdu'l-Bahá |
|---|---|---|---|---|---|---|---|---|---|---|---|
| 2024 | 20 Mar | 20 Apr | 28 Apr | 1 May | 23 May | 28 May | 9 Jul | 2 Nov | 3 Nov | 25 Nov | 27 Nov |
| 2025 | 20 Mar | 20 Apr | 28 Apr | 1 May | 23 May | 28 May | 9 Jul | 22 Oct | 23 Oct | 25 Nov | 27 Nov |
| 2026 | 21 Mar | 21 Apr | 29 Apr | 2 May | 24 May | 29 May | 10 Jul | 10 Nov | 11 Nov | 26 Nov | 28 Nov |
| 2027 | 21 Mar | 21 Apr | 29 Apr | 2 May | 24 May | 29 May | 10 Jul | 30 Oct | 31 Oct | 26 Nov | 28 Nov |
| 2028 | 20 Mar | 20 Apr | 28 Apr | 1 May | 23 May | 28 May | 9 Jul | 19 Oct | 20 Oct | 25 Nov | 27 Nov |
| 2029 | 20 Mar | 20 Apr | 28 Apr | 1 May | 23 May | 28 May | 9 Jul | 7 Nov | 8 Nov | 25 Nov | 27 Nov |
| 2030 | 20 Mar | 20 Apr | 28 Apr | 1 May | 23 May | 28 May | 9 Jul | 28 Oct | 29 Oct | 25 Nov | 27 Nov |
| 2031 | 21 Mar | 21 Apr | 29 Apr | 2 May | 24 May | 29 May | 10 Jul | 17 Oct | 18 Oct | 26 Nov | 28 Nov |

== Western accounts ==
These events were recorded by western sources. Provided below is one source that is attributed to Sir Justin Sheil, Queen Victoria's Envoy Extraordinary and Minister Plenipotentiary in Tehran and written to Lord Palmerston, the British Secretary of State for Foreign Affairs, 22 July 1850. This source does not claim to be an eyewitness account.

The founder of the sect has been executed at Tabreez. He was killed by a volley of musketry, and his death was on the point of giving his religion a lustre which would have largely increased his proselytes. When the smoke and dust cleared away after the volley, Báb was not to be seen, and the populace proclaimed that he had ascended to the skies. The balls had broken the ropes by which he was bound, but he was dragged from the recess where after some search he was discovered and shot. His death, according to the belief of his disciples, will make no difference as Báb must always exist.

— Sir Justin Sheil,

Shoghi Effendi also prints a large selection of western quotes in his book God Passes By, though most are unsourced.

== Mírzá Mihdí Khán Zaímu'd-Dawlih ==
Mírzá Mihdí Khán Zaímu'd-Dawlih was the son of a Shiʻite cleric who was present at the execution of the Báb and who took his son to the barracks square to review the events he witnessed. Zaímu'd-Dawlih recounted his father's version in a book, Miftáh-i-Bábu'l-Abváb ya Taríkh-i-Báb va Bahá (Key to the Gate of Gates, or the History of the Báb and Bahá), published about A.H. 1310 (about 1896). The work is a polemically anti-Baháʼí book, but the account of the execution includes the following details:

1. The Báb and Anís were suspended about three meters (10 ft) above the ground on a rope and fired on by a Christian regiment.
2. The bullets cut the rope and one bullet wounded Anís.
3. The Báb ran into one of the rooms in the barracks.
4. The Báb was brought back out and he and Anís were shot again, this time fatally.

== See also ==
- Capital punishment in Iran
- Seven Martyrs of Tehran
- Bab's recantation
