= Ayyám-i-Há =

Intercalary days in the Baháʼí calendar

Key dates of the Baháʼí calendar
| Year | Ayyám-i-Há | | Fast | | Naw-Rúz |
|---|---|---|---|---|---|
| 2024 | 26 Feb | 29 Feb | 1 Mar | 19 Mar | 20 Mar |
| 2025 | 25 Feb | 28 Feb | 1 Mar | 19 Mar | 20 Mar |
| 2026 | 25 Feb | 1 Mar | 2 Mar | 20 Mar | 21 Mar |
| 2027 | 26 Feb | 1 Mar | 2 Mar | 20 Mar | 21 Mar |
| 2028 | 26 Feb | 29 Feb | 1 Mar | 19 Mar | 20 Mar |
| 2029 | 25 Feb | 28 Feb | 1 Mar | 19 Mar | 20 Mar |
| 2030 | 25 Feb | 28 Feb | 1 Mar | 19 Mar | 20 Mar |
| 2031 | 25 Feb | 1 Mar | 2 Mar | 20 Mar | 21 Mar |

Ayyám-i-Há is a period of intercalary days in the Baháʼí calendar, when Baháʼís celebrate the Festival of Ayyám-i-Há. The four or five days of this period are inserted between the last two months of the calendar (Mulk and ʻAláʼ). The length of Ayyám-i-Há varies according to the timing of the following vernal equinox so that the next year always starts on the vernal equinox.

2026 has five days of Ayyám-i-Há: from sunset on Tuesday, February 24, to sunset on Sunday, March 1.

== History ==
The Báb, the founder of the Bábí Faith, instituted the Badíʻ calendar in the Persian Bayán with 19 months of 19 days each and a period of intercalary days to allow for the calendar to be solar. The introduction of intercalation marked an important break from Islam, as under the Islamic calendar the practice of intercalation had been condemned in the Qurʼan. The Báb did not, however, specify where the intercalary days should go. Baháʼu'lláh, who claimed to be the one foretold by the Báb, confirmed and adopted the Badíʻ calendar in the Kitáb-i-Aqdas, his book of laws. He placed the intercalary days before the fasting month of ʻAlá, the nineteenth and last month, and gave the intercalary days the name "Ayyám-i-Há" or "Days of Ha". Prior to 172 B.E. (2015 A.D.), Ayyám-i-Há was from sunset on February 25 to sunset on March 1.

== Symbolism and celebration ==
Ayyám-i-Há means the "Days of Há" and commemorates the transcendence of God over his attributes since "Há" has been used as a symbol of the essence of God in the Baháʼí holy writings. Under the Arabic abjad system, the letter Há has the numerical value of five -- the five-pointed star, or haykal (Arabic: temple) is a symbol of the Baháʼí Faith as mentioned by Shoghi Effendi, head of the Baháʼí Faith in the first half of the 20th century: "Strictly speaking the 5-pointed star is a symbol of our Faith, as used by the Báb and explained by Him." The five-pointed star has been used as the outline of special letters or tablets by both the Báb and Baháʼu'lláh. The number 5 is also equal to the maximum number of days in Ayyám-i-Há in the Badíʻ calendar.

During the Festival of Ayyám-i-Há Baháʼís are encouraged to celebrate God and his oneness by showing love, fellowship and unity. In many instances Baháʼís give and accept gifts to demonstrate these attributes, and because of this gift giving period, it is sometimes compared to Christmas, but many Baha'is only exchange small gifts because gifts are not the main focus. It is also a time of charity and goodwill and Baháʼís often participate in various projects of a humanitarian nature. These projects, service projects, are to serve and better the community. For example, some common service projects done in Ayyám-i-Há include picking up trash, clothing drives, canned food drives, etc. This shows the nature of Ayyám-i-Há is not only joyous and celebratory, but also is a period of service and devotion to the community.
