= Day of the Covenant (Baháʼí) =

Bahá'í religious observance commemorating appointment of 'Abdu'l-Bahá

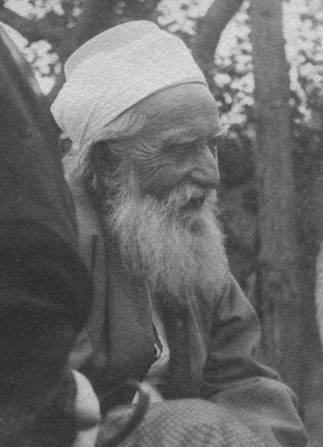
ʻAbdu'l-Bahá during his American trip in 1912.

The Day of the Covenant is a holy day in the Baháʼí Faith that commemorates the appointment of ʻAbdu'l-Bahá as the Centre of Baha'u'llah's Covenant. It occurs annually on November 25 or 26.

Since May 23 was the day that the Báb declared his mission, ʻAbdu'l-Bahá stated that it should be exclusively associated with the Báb and under no circumstances be celebrated as his birthday. However, the Baháʼís requested a day to celebrate and honor ʻAbdu'l-Bahá, and he designated November 26, 181 days after the ascension of Baháʼu'lláh, to be observed as the day of the appointment of the Centre of the Covenant.

The observance was originally known as the Jashn-i-Aʻzam in Persian ("The Greatest Festival"), reflecting ʻAbdu'l-Bahá's title as "the Greatest Branch"; in the West, the holy day became known as the Day of the Covenant.

== Background ==
In Baháʼí belief, the Covenant refers to a practice of explicit succession of authority meant to preserve unity within the religion after the death of its founder. Baháʼu'lláh appointed ʻAbdu'l-Bahá as his "successor, interpreter, and exemplar," establishing a clear line of leadership.

This system of succession is central to Baháʼí institutional structure, which emphasizes unity and the oneness of humanity as foundational principles, with a focus on maintaining cohesion and avoiding division within the community.

== Observance ==
While the Day of the Covenant has no required observances, Baháʼís honor ʻAbdu'l-Bahá as the Centre of the Covenant of Baháʼu'lláh through gatherings that typically include prayers, readings from sacred texts, music, and community reflection. These gatherings emphasize themes of unity, collective identity, and spiritual reflection, and may vary across different regions, reflecting the global and diverse nature of the Baháʼí community. The day is one of two Baháʼí holy days where work does not need to be suspended.

== Significance ==
The Day of the Covenant holds particular importance within the Baháʼí Faith as it commemorates the establishment of a clear system of succession designed to maintain unity within the community. By commemorating the appointment of ʻAbdu'l-Bahá, the holy day highlights the role of institutional continuity in preventing factions and division.

More broadly, the observance reflects the centrality of unity in Baháʼí teachings and reinforces the idea that cohesion within the community is essential to both its spiritual life and its broader social teachings.
