= Baháʼí calendar =

Calendar of the Baháʼí faith

The Baháʼí calendar used in the Baháʼí Faith is a solar calendar consisting of nineteen months and four or five intercalary days, with new year at the moment of Northern spring equinox. Each month is named after a virtue (e.g., Perfection, Mercy), as are the days of the week. The first year is dated from 1844 CE, the year in which the Báb began teaching.

Years on the calendar are annotated with the date notation of BE (Baháʼí Era). The Baháʼí year 183 BE started on 21 March 2026.

== History ==
The Baháʼí calendar started from the original Badíʿ calendar, created by the Báb in the Kitábu'l-Asmáʼ and the Persian Bayán (5:3) in the 1840s. An early version of the calendar began to be implemented during his time. It used a scheme of nineteen months of nineteen days, with the product of 361 days, plus intercalary days to make the calendar a solar calendar. The first day of the early implementation of the calendar year was Nowruz, while the intercalary days were assigned differently than the later Baháʼí implementation. The calendar contains many symbolic meanings and allusions including connections to prophecies of the Báb about the next Manifestation of God termed He whom God shall make manifest.

Baháʼu'lláh, the founder of the Baháʼí Faith, who claimed to be the one prophesied by the Báb, confirmed and adopted this calendar. Around 1870, he instructed Nabíl-i-Aʻzam, the author of The Dawn-Breakers, to write an overview of the Badíʿ calendar. In the Kitáb-i-Aqdas (1873) Baháʼu'lláh made Naw-Rúz the first day of the year, and also clarified the position of the Intercalary days to immediately precede the last month. Baháʼu'lláh set Naw-Rúz to the day on which the sun passes into the constellation Aries. Baháʼís interpret this formula as a specification of the vernal equinox, though where that should be determined was not defined.

The calendar was first implemented in the West in 1907.

The Baháʼí scriptures left some issues regarding the implementation of the Badíʿ calendar to be resolved by the Universal House of Justice before the calendar can be observed uniformly worldwide.

On 10 July 2014 the Universal House of Justice announced provisions that will enable the common implementation of the Badíʿ calendar worldwide, beginning at sunset 20 March 2015, coinciding with the completion of the ninth cycle of the calendar (see below). Before that time, the Baháʼí calendar was synchronized to the Gregorian calendar by starting the year at sunset on March 20, regardless of when the vernal equinox technically occurs, meaning that the extra day of a leap year occurred simultaneously in both calendars. The intercalary days always stretched from 26 February to 1 March, automatically including the Gregorian leap day so that there were four intercalary days in a regular year, and five in a Gregorian leap year. The Universal House of Justice selected Tehran, the birthplace of Baháʼu'lláh, as the location at which the time and date of the vernal equinox is to be determined according to astronomical tables from reliable sources. These changes, which "unlocked" the Badíʿ calendar from the Gregorian calendar, came into effect at the start of year 172 BE.

== Significance ==
As the name Badíʿ (wondrous or unique) suggests, the Baháʼí calendar is indeed a unique institution in the history of human culture. Sociologist Eviatar Zerubavel notes that the nineteen-day cycle creates a distinctive rhythm which enhances group solidarity. (Zerubavel argues that the nineteen-day cycle is more properly defined as a week, rather than a month, because it bears "no connection whatsoever" to the lunar cycle.) Furthermore, by finding the closest approximation of the square root of the annual cycle, Baháʼís "have managed to establish the most symmetrical relationship possible between the week and the year, which no one else throughout history has ever managed to accomplish."

== Years ==
Years in the Baháʼí calendar are counted from Thursday 21 March 1844, the beginning of the Baháʼí Era or Badíʿ Era (abbreviated BE or B.E.). Year 1 BE thus began at sundown 20 March 1844.

The length of each year is strictly defined as the number of days between the opening and closing days of the year, with the number of intercalary days adjusted as needed. The year ends on the day before the following vernal equinox.

=== Vernal Equinox ===
Key dates of the Baháʼí calendar
Year	Ayyám-i-Há		Fast		Naw-Rúz
2024	26 Feb	29 Feb	1 Mar	19 Mar	20 Mar
2025	25 Feb	28 Feb	1 Mar	19 Mar	20 Mar
2026	25 Feb	1 Mar	2 Mar	20 Mar	21 Mar
2027	26 Feb	1 Mar	2 Mar	20 Mar	21 Mar
2028	26 Feb	29 Feb	1 Mar	19 Mar	20 Mar
2029	25 Feb	28 Feb	1 Mar	19 Mar	20 Mar
2030	25 Feb	28 Feb	1 Mar	19 Mar	20 Mar
2031	25 Feb	1 Mar	2 Mar	20 Mar	21 Mar

The first day of each year (Naw-Rúz) is the day (from sunset to sunset) in Tehran containing the moment of the vernal equinox. This is determined in advance by astronomical computations from reliable sources.

Since the Gregorian calendar is not tied to the equinox, the Gregorian calendar shifts around by a day or two each year, as shown in the following table.

== Months ==
The Baháʼí calendar is composed of nineteen months, each with nineteen days. The intercalary days, known as Ayyám-i-Há, occur between the eighteenth and nineteenth months.

The names of the months were adopted by the Báb from the Du'ay-i-Sahar, a Ramadan dawn prayer by Imam Muhammad al-Baqir, the fifth Imam of Twelver Shiʻah Islam. These month names are considered to be referring to attributes of God.

In the Persian Bayan the Báb divides the months into four groups known as "fire", "air", "water" and "earth" – which are three, four, six and six months long respectively. Robin Mirshahi suggests a possible link with four realms described in Baháʼí cosmology. Ismael Velasco relates this to the "arc of ascent".

In the following table, the Gregorian date indicates the first full day of the month when Naw-Rúz coincides with 21 March. The month begins at sunset of the day previous to the one listed.

Month	Usual Gregorian dates (when Naw-Rúz coincides with 21 March)	Arabic name	Arabic script	English name	Additional meanings in authorized English translations of Baháʼí scripture
1	21 March – 8 April	Bahá	بهاء	Splendour	glory, light, excellence
2	9 April – 27 April	Jalál	جلال	Glory	majesty
3	28 April – 16 May	Jamál	جمال	Beauty	charm
4	17 May – 4 June	ʻAẓamat	عظمة	Grandeur	glory, majesty, dominion, greatness
5	5 June – 23 June	Núr	نور	Light	radiance, brightness, splendour, effulgence, illumination
6	24 June – 12 July	Raḥmat	رحمة	Mercy	blessing, grace, favour, loving kindness, providence, compassion
7	13 July – 31 July	Kalimát	كلمات	Words	utterance, the word of God
8	1 August – 19 August	Kamál	كمال	Perfection	excellence, fullness, consummation, maturity
9	20 August – 7 September	Asmáʼ	اسماء	Names	titles, attributes, designations
10	8 September – 26 September	ʻIzzat	عزة	Might	glory, power, exaltation, honour, majesty, grandeur, strength, sovereignty, magnificence
11	27 September – 15 October	Mas͟híyyat	مشية	Will	purpose, the primal will, the will of God
12	16 October – 3 November	ʻIlm	علم	Knowledge	wisdom, divine knowledge, revelation
13	4 November – 22 November	Qudrat	قدرة	Power	might, authority, dominion, celestial might, omnipotence, transcendent power, indomitable strength, all-pervading power, ascendancy, divine power
14	23 November – 11 December	Qawl	قول	Speech	words, testimony
15	12 December – 30 December	Masáʼil	مسائل	Questions	principles, truths, matters, mysteries, subtleties, obscurities, intricacies, problems (Note: In a provisional translation of selections from the Báb's Kitábu'l-Asmáʼ, Bahá'í scholar Stephen Lambden adds "objectives", "propositions" as alternative translations for "questions".)
16	31 December – 18 January	S͟haraf	شرف	Honour	excellence, glory
17	19 January – 6 February	Sulṭán	سلطان	Sovereignty	king, lord, majesty, sovereign, monarch, authority, potency, the power of sovereignty, the all-possessing, the most potent of rulers
18	7 February – 25 February	Mulk	ملك	Dominion	sovereignty, kingdom, realm, universe
ic	26 February – 1 March	Ayyám-i-Há	ايام الهاء	The Days of Há	intercalary days
19	2 March – 20 March (Month of fasting)	ʻAláʼ	علاء	Loftiness	glory

=== Ayyám-i-Há ===
The introduction of intercalation marked an important break from Islam, as under the Islamic calendar the practice of intercalation had been specifically prohibited in the Qurʼan.

The number of the intercalary days is determined in advance to ensure that the year ends on the day before the next vernal equinox. This results in 4 or 5 intercalary days being added. These days are inserted between the 18th and 19th months, falling around the end of February in the Gregorian calendar. The number of days added is unrelated to the timing of the Gregorian leap year.

=== Significance in the Baháʼí Faith ===
The annual Nineteen Day Fast is held during the final month of ʻAláʼ. The month of fasting is followed by Naw-Rúz, the new year.

The monthly Nineteen Day Feast is celebrated on the first day of each month, preferably starting any time between the sunset on the eve of the day to the sunset ending the day.

== Days in a Month ==
The nineteen days in a month have the same names as the months of the year (above), so, for example, the 9th day of each month is Asmá, or "Names".

== Weekdays ==
The Baháʼí week starts on Saturday, and ends on Friday. As in Judaism and Islam, days begin at sunset and end at sunset of the following solar day. Baháʼí writings indicate that Friday is to be kept as a day of rest. The practice of keeping Friday as a day of rest is currently not observed in all countries; for example, in the UK, the National Spiritual Assembly of the Baháʼís confirmed it does not currently keep this practice.

Arabic Name	Arabic Script	English Translation	Day of the Week
Jalál	جلال	Glory	Saturday
Jamál	جمال	Beauty	Sunday
Kamál	كمال	Perfection	Monday
Fiḍál	فضال	Grace	Tuesday
ʻIdál	عدال	Justice	Wednesday
Istijlál	استجلال	Majesty	Thursday
Istiqlál	استقلال	Independence	Friday

== Cycles ==
Also existing in the Baháʼí calendar system is a nineteen-year cycle called Váḥid and a 361 year (19×19) supercycle called Kull-i-S͟hayʼ (literally, "All Things"). The expression Kull-i-Shayʼ was used frequently by the Báb. It has its origins in Sufism and the significance of the numbers 19 and 361 were possibly already associated by Ibn Arabi (1165–1240).

Each of the nineteen years in a Vahid has been given a name as shown in the table below. The tenth Váḥid of the 1st Kull-i-S͟hayʼ started on 21 March 2015, and the eleventh Váḥid will begin in 2034.

The current Baháʼí year, year 183 BE (20 March 2026 – 20 March 2027), is the year Aḥad of the tenth Váḥid of the first Kull-i-S͟hayʼ. The second Kull-i-S͟hayʼ will begin in 2205.

The concept of a nineteen-year cycle has existed in some form since the fourth century BCE. The Metonic cycle represents an invented measure that approximately correlates solar and lunar markings of time and which appears in several calendar systems.

Years in a Váḥid

No.	Name	Arabic Script	English Translation
1	Alif	أ	A
2	Bá'	ب	B
3	Ab	أب	Father
4	Dál	د	D
5	Báb	باب	Gate
6	Váv	و	V
7	Abad	أبد	Eternity
8	Jád	جاد	Generosity
9	Bahá	بهاء	Splendour
10	Ḥubb	حب	Love
11	Bahháj	بهاج	Delightful
12	Javáb	جواب	Answer
13	Aḥad	احد	Single
14	Vahháb	وﻫﺎب	Bountiful
15	Vidád	وداد	Affection
16	Badíʿ	بدیع	Beginning
17	Bahí	بهي	Luminous
18	Abhá	ابهى	Most Luminous
19	Váḥid	واحد	Unity

== See also ==
- List of observances set by the Baháʼí calendar
- Baháʼí Holy Days
- Baháʼí Faith
- Calendar
- Intercalation (timekeeping)
- 19 (number)
- Zoroastrian calendar
