= Baháʼí Naw-Rúz =

First day of the Bahá'í calendar year

Key dates of the Baháʼí calendar
Year	Ayyám-i-Há		Fast		Naw-Rúz
2024	26 Feb	29 Feb	1 Mar	19 Mar	20 Mar
2025	25 Feb	28 Feb	1 Mar	19 Mar	20 Mar
2026	25 Feb	1 Mar	2 Mar	20 Mar	21 Mar
2027	26 Feb	1 Mar	2 Mar	20 Mar	21 Mar
2028	26 Feb	29 Feb	1 Mar	19 Mar	20 Mar
2029	25 Feb	28 Feb	1 Mar	19 Mar	20 Mar
2030	25 Feb	28 Feb	1 Mar	19 Mar	20 Mar
2031	25 Feb	1 Mar	2 Mar	20 Mar	21 Mar

Naw-Rúz (Persian: نوروز, romanized: Nowruz) is the first day of the Baháʼí calendar year, and one of eleven holy days for adherents of the Baháʼí Faith. It occurs on the northern vernal equinox, on or near March 21, which is also the traditional Persian New Year.

The traditional Nowruz holiday, from which the Baha'i holiday derives, has been celebrated since ancient times in Iran, and is observed by culturally-adjacent peoples in Azerbaijan, Turkey, Uzbekistan, Turkmenistan, Iraq, Armenia, Georgia, Russia, Afghanistan, Pakistan, Syria, and Tajikistan. The Báb, the founder of Bábism, and then Baháʼu'lláh, the founder of the Baháʼí Faith, adopted the day as a holy day and associated it with the Most Great Name of God. The Baha'i holiday as now calculated does not always fall on the same day as the traditional festival (but may differ by one day), and does not incorporate a number of Persian cultural practices associated with the traditional holiday, but is a religious event featuring readings from Baha'i scriptures.

For 2026, Naw-Rúz begins at sunset on Friday, March 20 and ends at sunset on Saturday, March 21.

== Significance ==
The Báb, the founder of Bábi religion, instituted the Badíʻ calendar composed of 19 months, each of 19 days. The first month, and the first day of each month, are all named Bahá, an Arabic word meaning splendour or glory. Thus Naw-Rúz, the first day of the year, is the day of Bahá in the month of Bahá. The day was called the Day of God by the Báb, and was associated with He whom God shall make manifest, a messianic figure in the Báb's writings.

Baháʼu'lláh, the founder of the Baháʼí Faith who is recognized as the messianic figure expected by the Báb, adopted the new calendar and the use of Naw-Rúz as a holy day. The day follows the Baháʼí month of fasting, and he explained that Naw-Rúz was associated with the Most Great Name of God, and was instituted as a festival for those who observed the fast.

The symbolic notion of the renewal of time in each religious dispensation was made explicit by the writings of the Báb and Baháʼu'lláh and the calendar and the new year made this spiritual metaphor more concrete. ʻAbdu'l-Bahá, Baháʼu'lláh's son and successor, explained that significance of Naw-Rúz in terms of spring and the new life it brings. He explained that the equinox is a symbol of the Manifestations of God, who include Jesus, Muhammad, the Báb and Baháʼu'lláh among others, and the message that they proclaim is like a spiritual springtime, and that Naw-Rúz is used to commemorate it.

== Date ==
Baháʼu'lláh, in the Kitáb-i-Aqdas, defines Naw-Rúz as the day on which the vernal equinox occurs. The exact timing of Naw-Rúz for Baháʼís worldwide depends on the choice of a particular spot on the Earth and was left to the Universal House of Justice, the governing body of the Baháʼís, to decide. In 2014, the Universal House of Justice chose Tehran as the particular spot. Since Baháʼí days start at sundown, if the equinox occurs just before sunset, the day which started on the previous sunset is Naw-Rúz. Thus Naw-Rúz could fall between March 19th and March 21st of the Gregorian calendar. These dates are pre-calculated years in advance. All dates in the Baháʼí calendar are set in relation to Naw-Rúz and thus may shift on the Gregorian calendar by a day or two depending on the timing of the vernal equinox.

== Celebration ==
Naw-Rúz is one of nine Baháʼí holy days where work and school must be suspended; the only one that is not associated with an event in the lives of either the Báb or Baháʼu'lláh. It is usually a festive event observed with meetings for prayer and music and dancing. Since the new year also ends the Baháʼí month of fasting the celebration is often combined with a dinner. As with all Baháʼí holy days, there are few fixed rules for observing Naw-Rúz, and Baháʼís all over the world celebrate it as a festive day, according to local custom. Persian Baháʼís may observe some of the Iranian customs associated with Nowruz such as the Haft Sîn, while American Baháʼí communities, for example, may have a potluck dinner, along with prayers and readings from Baháʼí scripture.

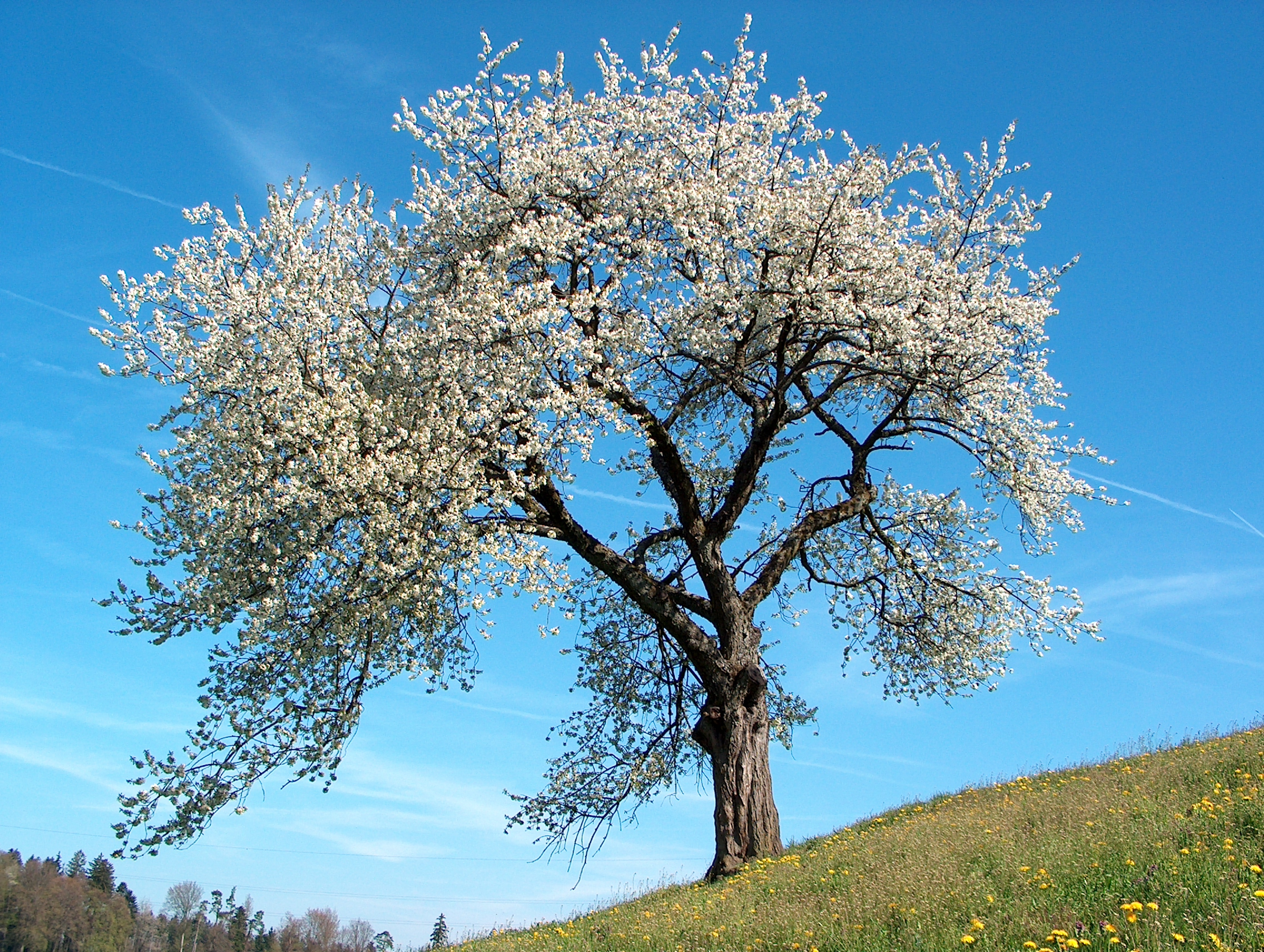
In the Northern Hemisphere Naw-Rúz marks the coming of spring.
