= Baháʼí literature =

Literary genre

Baháʼí literature includes the books, letters, and recorded public talks of the Baháʼí Faith's founders, the clarifying letters of Shoghi Effendi, the elucidations of the Universal House of Justice, and a variety of commentary and history published by Baháʼí authors.

The Faith's scriptural texts are the writings of the Báb, Baháʼu'lláh, and ʻAbdu'l-Bahá, written in Arabic or Persian in the late 19th and early 20th century Middle East. The religion's most prominent doctrinal foundation comes from the Kitáb-i-Íqán (Book of Certitude), a work composed by Baháʼu'lláh in 1861. Later in 1873, he wrote the Kitáb-i-Aqdas (Most Holy Book), which is the central text of the Baháʼí Faith. Some Answered Questions is a compilation of table talks between ʻAbdu'l-Bahá and a western pilgrim that was recorded in the original Persian language. From 1910-13, ʻAbdu'l-Bahá traveled through Europe and North America giving many public talks that were recorded by stenographers and published under the titles Paris Talks and The Promulgation of Universal Peace.

The writings of the Báb and Baháʼu'lláh are regarded as divine revelation, superseding but not in conflict with the Qur'an, Bible, and other major religious works. The writings and talks of ʻAbdu'l-Bahá and the writings of Shoghi Effendi are regarded as authoritative interpretation, and those of the Universal House of Justice as authoritative legislation and elucidation. Some measure of divine guidance is assumed for all of these texts. Individual Baháʼí authors cannot provide authoritative or inspired interpretations in the context of Baháʼí religious doctrine, and their works are reviewed by Baháʼí national offices for accuracy and dignity.

The Baháʼí Faith relies extensively on its literature. Literacy is strongly encouraged so that believers may read the texts for themselves. Doctrinal questions are routinely addressed by returning to primary works.

== Literary forms ==
Generally speaking, the literary form of a particular book can generally be observed by noting the author and/or title.

=== Scripture, inspiration and interpretation ===
Timeline of Baháʼí writings
1844–1850	The Báb
1852–1892	Baháʼu'lláh
1892–1921	ʻAbdu'l-Bahá (Note: The majority of ʻAbdu'l-Bahá's writings are from the period 1892–1921, while a few have an earlier date: Secret of Divine Civilization (1875), A Traveller's Narrative (1886) and his commentary on 'I was a Hidden Treasure'.)
1921–1957	Shoghi Effendi
1963–present	Universal House of Justice

Baháʼís believe that the founders of the religion, The Báb and Baháʼu'lláh, received revelation directly from God. As such their works are considered divinely inspired. These works are considered to be "revealed text" or revelation.

ʻAbdu'l-Bahá was appointed by Baháʼu'lláh to be his successor and was authorized by him to interpret the religion's "revealed text." The works of ʻAbdu'l-Bahá are therefore considered authoritative directives and interpretation, as well as part of Baháʼí scripture. He, along with The Báb and Baháʼu'lláh, is considered one of the "Central Figures" of the religion.

Likewise Shoghi Effendi's interpretations and directives are considered authoritative, but are not considered to expand upon the "revealed text", or to be scripture.

In the Baháʼí view, the Universal House of Justice does not have the position to interpret the founders' works, nor those of ʻAbdu'l-Bahá or Shoghi Effendi. However, it is charged with addressing any question not addressed in those works. As such its directives are considered authoritative, as long as they are in force (the Universal House of Justice may alter or revoke its own earlier decisions as needed), and are often collected into compilations or folios.

The works of the Central Figures, Shoghi Effendi, and the Universal House of Justice taken together are the canonical texts of the Baha'i Faith.

A special category of works consist of the prayers of the Central Figures. These were often included in original letters and have been collected into various prayer books. Baháʼu'lláh's Prayers and Meditations is a significant volume. As Baháʼís are to pray, meditate, and study sacred scripture daily, these books are common.

=== History and biography ===
Shoghi Effendi's only book, God Passes By, is a central text covering the history of the faith from 1844 to 1944. Nabil-Zarandi's Dawn Breakers covers the Bábí period extensively through to Baháʼu'lláh's banishment from Persia in 1853.

Ruhiyyih Rabbani's Ministry of the Custodians details the interregnum between Shoghi Effendi's death in 1957 and the election of the Universal House of Justice in 1963.

Other authors have revisited the early periods of the religion in the Middle East or addressed historical periods in other places. Some of these contain significant amounts of biographical data and can be considered biographies. Notably, Balyuzi's and Taherzadeh's works have focused on the history and biographies of the central figures of the religion and their significant contemporaries.

=== Introduction and study materials ===
One of the earliest introductory texts available in English is Esslemont's Baháʼu'lláh and the New Era. This book, originally published in 1923, has undergone several revisions over time to update, correct, and clarify its contents though ʻAbdu'l-Bahá was able to personally review several of its chapters. More than sixty years later, it remains in the top ten of cited Baháʼí books.

Several other introductory texts are available. Hatcher & Martin's The Baháʼí Faith: The Emerging Global Religion, Momen's A Short Introduction to the Baháʼí Faith, and Smith's The Baháʼí Religion are some examples.

Of considerable importance to the Baháʼí community worldwide is the Ruhi series of study materials inspired, and largely produced, by the Baháʼí community of Colombia. These books form the core texts used in "Study Circles" and "Training Institutes" by Baháʼí communities around the world.

=== Apologia ===
A few of Baháʼu'lláh's works may classify as apologia. In addition to being significant doctrinal works, his Kitáb-i-Íqán (Book of Certitude) and Epistle to the Son of the Wolf address both Islamic and Baháʼí audiences.

During Baháʼu'lláh's lifetime, both Nabíl-i-Akbar and Mírzá Abu'l-Faḍl Gulpáygání were noteworthy Shiʻa scholars who accepted the religion. Nabíl-i-Akbar was well versed in, and wrote on Shiʻa issues. Mírzá Abu'l-Faḍl wrote extensively on both Christian and Shiʻa apologia, most notably in his book The Brilliant Proof.

While Townshend's Christ and Baháʼu'lláh may also be regarded as an apologetic response to Christian concerns, Udo Schaefer, et al.'s Making the Crooked Straight is a decidedly apologetic response to Ficicchia's polemical Der Baháʼísmus - Religion der Zukunft? (Baháʼísm – Religion of the future?), a book which was published and promoted by the Evangelische Zentralstrelle für Weltanschauungsfragen (Central Office of the Protestant Church for Questions of Ideology) in the 1980s. This organization has since revoked its affiliation with Ficicchia and now recognizes the Baháʼí Faith as an important partner in inter-religious dialogue.

== Revelation ==
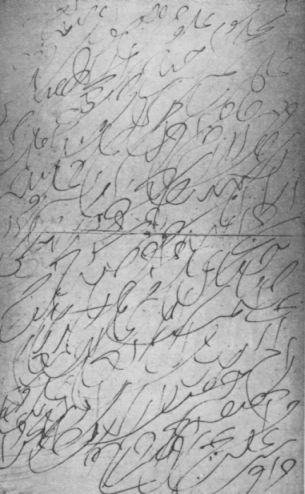
'Revelation writing': The first draft of a tablet of Baháʼu'lláh

Baháʼu'lláh occasionally would write himself, but normally the revelation was dictated to his secretaries, whose tracts are sometimes recorded in what has been called revelation writing, a shorthand script written with extreme speed owing to the rapidity of the utterance being transcribed. Afterwards, Baháʼu'lláh revised and approved these drafts. These revelation drafts and many other transcriptions of the writings of Baháʼu'lláh's, some of which are in his own handwriting, are kept in the International Baháʼí Archives in Haifa, Israel.

Some large works, for example, the Kitáb-i-Íqán, were revealed in a very short time, as in a night, or a few days.

=== Volume ===
Baháʼu'lláh wrote many books, tablets, and prayers, of which only a fraction have so far been translated into English. He revealed thousands of tablets with a total volume more than 70 times that of the Qurʼan and more than 15 times that of the Bible. Over 7000 tablets and other works have been collected of an estimated 15,000 texts. Considering the great scope and volume of Baháʼu'lláh's writings which Bahá'ís possess, it is interesting Baháʼu'lláh's amanuensis Mírzá Áqá Ján reported that on numerous occasions (especially while in Baghdad) Baháʼu'lláh expressly ordered that hundreds of thousands of his recorded verses be "obliterated and cast into the river" as Baháʼu'lláh felt people at that time were not yet ready for them. Though a small percentage of Bahá'u'lláh's original writings have been translated into English, those completed include many of his most important works.

== Language ==
Most Baháʼí literature, including all the writings of Baháʼu'lláh, was originally written in either Persian or Arabic. English translations use the characteristic Baháʼí orthography developed by Shoghi Effendi to render the original names. His work was not just that of a translator, as he was also the designated interpreter of the writings, and his translations are used as a standard for current translations of the Baháʼí writings.

A style guide, available at the bahai.org website, gives a glossary and pronunciation guide of names and concepts as used within the Baháʼí Faith, including,

- Baháʼí Faith, pronounced as: Ba-HIGH
- Baháʼu'lláh, pronounced as: Ba-ha-ul-LAH
- Báb, pronounced as: Bahb (Bob)
- ʻAbdu'l-Bahá, pronounced as: Abdul ba-HAH
- Baháʼí Naw-Rúz, pronounced as: Naw Rooz
- Ridván, pronounced as: REZ-vahn

== Authenticity and authority ==
The question of the authenticity of given texts is of great concern to Baháʼís. As noted, they attach considerable importance to the writings of those they consider to be authoritative figures. The primary duty of the Research Department of the Universal House of Justice and the International Baháʼí Library is the collection, cataloguing, authentication, and translation of these texts.

By way of comparison, "pilgrims' notes" are items or sayings that are attributed to the central figures but have not been authenticated. While these may be inspirational, they are not considered authoritative. Some of ʻAbdu'l-Bahá's collected talks (e.g. ʻAbdu'l-Bahá in London, Paris Talks, and The Promulgation of Universal Peace) may fall into this category, but are awaiting further authentication. The Star of the West, published in the United States from 1910 to 1924, contains many pilgrim's notes and unauthenticated letters of ʻAbdu'l-Bahá.

There is no Baháʼí corollary to Islamic Hadith; in fact, Baháʼís do not consider Hadith authoritative.

The Baháʼí community seeks to expand the body of authenticated and translated texts. The 1992 publication of the English translation of Baháʼu'lláh's The Kitáb-i-Aqdas, and the more recent Gems of Divine Mysteries (2002), The Summons of the Lord of Hosts (2002), and The Tabernacle of Unity (2006) are significant additions to the body of work available.

At the same time there is concerted effort to re-translate, edit, and even redact works that are not authenticated. For example, ʻAbdu'l-Bahá on Divine Philosophy, published in 1916, was not reprinted at the direction of Shoghi Effendi. Also, early editions of Esslemont's Baháʼu'lláh and the New Era contained several passages that could not be authenticated, or were incorrect. These have been reviewed and updated in subsequent editions. This practice has been criticized by observers, but is considered an integral part of maintaining the integrity of the texts.

Bábí texts are proving very difficult to authenticate, despite the collection of a variety of documents by E.G. Browne in the late 19th and early 20th centuries. Browne's principal correspondents were Azalis, whom he considered to be the genuine followers of the Báb. Compounding the difficulties of collecting reliable manuscripts at such a distance – Browne was at Cambridge – was the widespread Azali practice of taqiyya (dissimulation), or concealing one's beliefs. Browne appears to have been unaware of this. Azali taqiyya rendered many early Bábí documents unreliable afterwards, as Azali Bábís would often alter and falsify Bábí teachings and history.

In contrast, dissimulation was condemned by Baháʼu'lláh and was gradually abandoned by the early Baháʼís.

== Select bibliography ==
The list below is incomplete. William P. Collins, in his Bibliography of English-language Works on the Bábí and Baháʼí Faiths, 1844–1985, gives a list of 2,819 items, which includes multiple editions.

For ease of browsing, the bibliography is sub-divided by author.

=== Authoritative ===
==== ʻAbdu'l-Bahá ====
- ʻAbdu'l-Bahá (1911). ʻAbdu'l-Bahá in London. London, UK: Baháʼí Publishing Trust (published 1982). ISBN 0-900125-50-0.
- ʻAbdu'l-Bahá (1918). ʻAbdu'l-Bahá on Divine Philosophy. Boston, USA: Tudor Press – via Baháʼí Library Online.
- ʻAbdu'l-Bahá (1972). Foundations of World Unity. Wilmette, Illinois, USA: Baháʼí Publishing Trust. ISBN 0-87743-018-7.
- ʻAbdu'l-Bahá (2021). Light of the World: Selected Tablets of 'Abdu'l-Bahá.
- ʻAbdu'l-Bahá (1915). Memorials of the Faithful. Wilmette, Illinois, USA: Baháʼí Publishing Trust (published 1997). ISBN 0-87743-242-2.
- ʻAbdu'l-Bahá (1912). Paris Talks. Baháʼí Distribution Service (published 1995). ISBN 1-870989-57-0.
- ʻAbdu'l-Bahá (1912). MacNutt (ed.). The Promulgation of Universal Peace. Wilmette, Illinois, USA: Baháʼí Publishing Trust (published 1982). ISBN 0-87743-172-8.
- ʻAbdu'l-Bahá (1875). Gail; Khan (eds.). The Secret of Divine Civilization. Wilmette, Illinois, USA: Baháʼí Publishing Trust (published 1990). ISBN 0-87743-008-X.
- ʻAbdu'l-Bahá (1978). Gail (ed.). Selections From the Writings of ʻAbdu'l-Bahá. Wilmette, Illinois, USA: Baháʼí Publishing Trust. ISBN 0-85398-084-5.
- ʻAbdu'l-Bahá (1908). Some Answered Questions. Wilmette, Illinois, USA: Baháʼí Publishing Trust (published 1990). ISBN 0-87743-162-0.
- ʻAbdu'l-Bahá (1909). Tablets of Abdul-Baha Abbas. Chicago, USA: Baháʼí Publishing Committee.
- ʻAbdu'l-Bahá (1917). Tablets of the Divine Plan. Wilmette, Illinois, USA: Baháʼí Publishing Trust (published 1991). ISBN 0-87743-233-3.
- ʻAbdu'l-Bahá (1919). The Question of Universal Peace - The Tablet to The Hague by ʻAbdu'l-Bahá. Den Haag, The Netherlands: Stichting Baháʼí Literatuur (published 1999). ISBN 90-70765-43-8 – via Baháʼí Library Online.
- ʻAbdu'l-Bahá (1886). Browne (ed.). A Traveller's Narrative: Written to illustrate the episode of the Bab (2004 reprint, with translator's notes ed.). Los Angeles, USA: Kalimát Press (published 2004). ISBN 1-890688-37-1.
- ʻAbdu'l-Bahá (1921). The Will And Testament of ʻAbdu'l-Bahá. Mona Vale, N.S.W, Australia: Baháʼí Publications Australia (published 1992). ISBN 0-909991-47-2.
  - Many of the above are collections but there are estimated to be over 15,000 texts archived, and over 30,000 possibly written in total.

==== Báb ====
- Persian Bayán
- Qayyūm al-asmā
- Kitábu'l-Asmáʼ
- Arabic Bayán
- The Báb (1976). Selections from the Writings of the Báb. Wilmette, Illinois, USA: Baháʼí Publishing Trust. ISBN 1-931847-30-4.

==== Baháʼu'lláh ====
- Baháʼu'lláh (1988) [Composed 1892]. Epistle to the Son of the Wolf. Wilmette, Illinois, USA: Baháʼí Publishing Trust. ISBN 0-87743-182-5.
- Baháʼu'lláh (2002). Gems of Divine Mysteries. Haifa, Israel: Baháʼí World Centre. ISBN 0-85398-975-3.
- Baháʼu'lláh (1976). Gleanings from the Writings of Baháʼu'lláh. Wilmette, Illinois, USA: Baháʼí Publishing Trust. ISBN 0-87743-187-6.
- Baháʼu'lláh (1858). The Hidden Words of Baháʼu'lláh. Wilmette, Illinois, USA: Baháʼí Publishing Trust (published 2003). ISBN 0-87743-296-1.
- Baháʼu'lláh (1873). The Kitáb-i-Aqdas: The Most Holy Book. Wilmette, Illinois, USA: Baháʼí Publishing Trust (published 1992). ISBN 0-85398-999-0.
- Baháʼu'lláh (1862). Kitáb-i-Íqán: The Book of Certitude. Wilmette, Illinois, USA: Baháʼí Publishing Trust (published 2003). ISBN 1-931847-08-8.
- Baháʼu'lláh (1974) [1st pub. 1938]. Prayers and Meditations. Wilmette, Illinois, USA: Baháʼí Publishing Trust. ISBN 0-87743-024-1.
- Baháʼu'lláh (1991). Proclamation of Baháʼu'lláh. Wilmette, Illinois, USA: Baháʼí Publishing Trust. ISBN 0-87743-064-0.
- Baháʼu'lláh (1863). The Seven Valleys and the Four Valleys. Wilmette, Illinois, USA: Baháʼí Publishing Trust (published 1991). ISBN 0-87743-227-9.
- Baháʼu'lláh (2002). The Summons of the Lord of Hosts. Haifa, Israel: Baháʼí World Centre. ISBN 0-85398-976-1.
- Baháʼu'lláh (2006). The Tabernacle of Unity, Baháʼu'lláh's Responses to Mánikchí Sáhib and Other Writings. Haifa, Israel: Baháʼí World Centre. ISBN 0-85398-969-9.
- Baháʼu'lláh (1994) [Composed 1873-92]. Tablets of Baháʼu'lláh Revealed After the Kitáb-i-Aqdas. Wilmette, Illinois, USA: Baháʼí Publishing Trust. ISBN 0-87743-174-4.
- Fire Tablet
- Long Healing Prayer
- Tablet of Ahmad (Arabic)
- Tablet of the Holy Mariner
  - Over 7000 tablets and other works have been collected of an estimated 15,000 texts. However, only a relative few have been translated and catalogued.

==== Central Figures: prayer books ====
- The Báb; Baháʼu'lláh; ʻAbdu'l-Bahá (1996). Baháʼí Daybook: Passages for Deepening and Meditation. Wilmette, Illinois, USA: Baháʼí Publishing Trust. ISBN 0-87743-154-X.
- The Báb; Baháʼu'lláh; ʻAbdu'l-Bahá (2002). Baháʼí Prayers: A Selection of Prayers Revealed by Baháʼu'lláh, the Báb, and ʻAbdu'l-Bahá. Wilmette, Illinois, USA: Baháʼí Publishing Trust. ISBN 0-87743-285-6.
- The Báb; Baháʼu'lláh; ʻAbdu'l-Bahá (2003). Fountains of Love: A Selection of Prayers and Meditations by Baháʼu'lláh, The Báb, and ʻAbdu'l-Bahá. Germany: Baháʼí Verlag GmbH. ISBN 3-87037-397-0.
- The Báb; Baháʼu'lláh; ʻAbdu'l-Bahá (2000). Remembrance of God: A Selection of Baháʼí Prayers and Holy Writings. New Delhi, India: Baháʼí Publishing Trust. ISBN 81-85091-64-1.

==== Central Figures and Shoghi Effendi: compilations ====
The Universal House of Justice has prepared several compilations of extracts from the Central Figures and Shoghi Effendi.

- Compilations (1991). Research Department of the Universal House of Justice (ed.). Compilation of Compilations, Volume I. Baháʼí World Centre: Baháʼí Publications Australia – via Baháʼí Library Online.
- Compilations (1991). Research Department of the Universal House of Justice (ed.). Compilation of Compilations, Volume II. Baháʼí World Centre: Baháʼí Publications Australia – via Baháʼí Library Online.
- Compilations (2000). Research Department of the Universal House of Justice (ed.). Compilation of Compilations, Volume III. Baháʼí World Centre: Baháʼí Publications Australia. ISBN 1-876322-84-5 – via Baháʼí Library Online.
- Compilations (1983). Hornby, Helen (ed.). Lights of Guidance: A Baháʼí Reference File. Baháʼí Publishing Trust, New Delhi, India. ISBN 81-85091-46-3 – via Baháʼí Library Online.

==== Shoghi Effendi ====
- Effendi, Shoghi (1938). The Advent of Divine Justice. Wilmette, Illinois, USA: Baháʼí Publishing Trust. ISBN 0-87743-195-7.
- Effendi, Shoghi (1974). Baháʼí Administration. Wilmette, Illinois, USA: Baháʼí Publishing Trust. ISBN 0-87743-166-3.
- Effendi, Shoghi (1980). Citadel of Faith: Messages to America, 1947-1957. Wilmette, Illinois, USA: Baháʼí Publishing Trust. ISBN 0-87743-145-0.
- Effendi, Shoghi (1970). Dawn of a New Day. India: Baháʼí Publishing Trust.
- Effendi, Shoghi (2009). Dear Co-worker - Messages from Shoghi Effendi to the Benelux countries. Leuven, Belgium: Brilliant Books. p. 164 – via Baháʼí Library Online.
- Effendi, Shoghi (1973). Directives from the Guardian. Hawaii Baháʼí Publishing Trust.
- Effendi, Shoghi (1981). The Dispensation of Baháʼu'lláh. Wilmette, Illinois, USA: Baháʼí Publishing Trust. ISBN 0-900125-46-2.
- Effendi, Shoghi (1944). God Passes By. Wilmette, Illinois, USA: Baháʼí Publishing Trust. ISBN 0-87743-020-9.
- Effendi, Shoghi (1982). The Light of Divine Guidance (Volume 1). Germany: Baháʼí Publishing Trust.
- Effendi, Shoghi (1982). The Light of Divine Guidance (Volume 2). Germany: Baháʼí Publishing Trust. ISBN 3-87037-159-5.
- Effendi, Shoghi (1971). Messages to the Baháʼí World, 1950-1957. Wilmette, Illinois, USA: Baháʼí Publishing Trust. ISBN 0-87743-036-5.
- Effendi, Shoghi (1976). Principles of Baháʼí Administration (4th ed.). London, UK: Baháʼí Publishing Trust. ISBN 0-900125-13-6 – via Baháʼí Library Online.
- Effendi, Shoghi (1996). The Promised Day is Come. Wilmette, Illinois, USA: Baháʼí Publishing Trust. ISBN 0-87743-244-9.
- Effendi, Shoghi (1938). The World Order of Baháʼu'lláh. Wilmette, Illinois, USA: Baháʼí Publishing Trust. ISBN 0-87743-231-7.

==== Universal House of Justice and its agencies ====
These are original works of the Universal House of Justice and its agencies as distinct from compilations.

- Baháʼí International Community (1992). Baháʼu'lláh. Baháʼí World Centre.
- Baháʼí International Community (2001). Century of Light. Wilmette, Illinois, USA: Baháʼí Publishing Trust. ISBN 0-87743-294-5.
- Universal House of Justice (2001). Attainment of the Unity of Nations and the Lesser Peace. Baháʼí World Centre – via Baháʼí Library Online.
- Universal House of Justice (1972). Constitution of the Universal House of Justice. Baháʼí World Centre – via Baháʼí Library Online.
- Universal House of Justice (2002). Letter to the World's Religious Leaders. Baháʼí World Centre – via Baháʼí Library Online.
- Universal House of Justice (1996). Marks, G.W. (ed.). Messages from the Universal House of Justice, 1963-1986: The Third Epoch of the Formative Age. Wilmette, Illinois, USA: Baháʼí Publishing Trust. ISBN 0-87743-239-2 – via Baháʼí Library Online.
- Universal House of Justice (2005). One Common Faith. Wilmette, Illinois, USA: Baháʼí Publishing Trust. ISBN 0-87743-315-1.
- Universal House of Justice (1986). The Promise of World Peace. London, UK: Oneworld. ISBN 1-85168-002-0.

=== Other authors ===
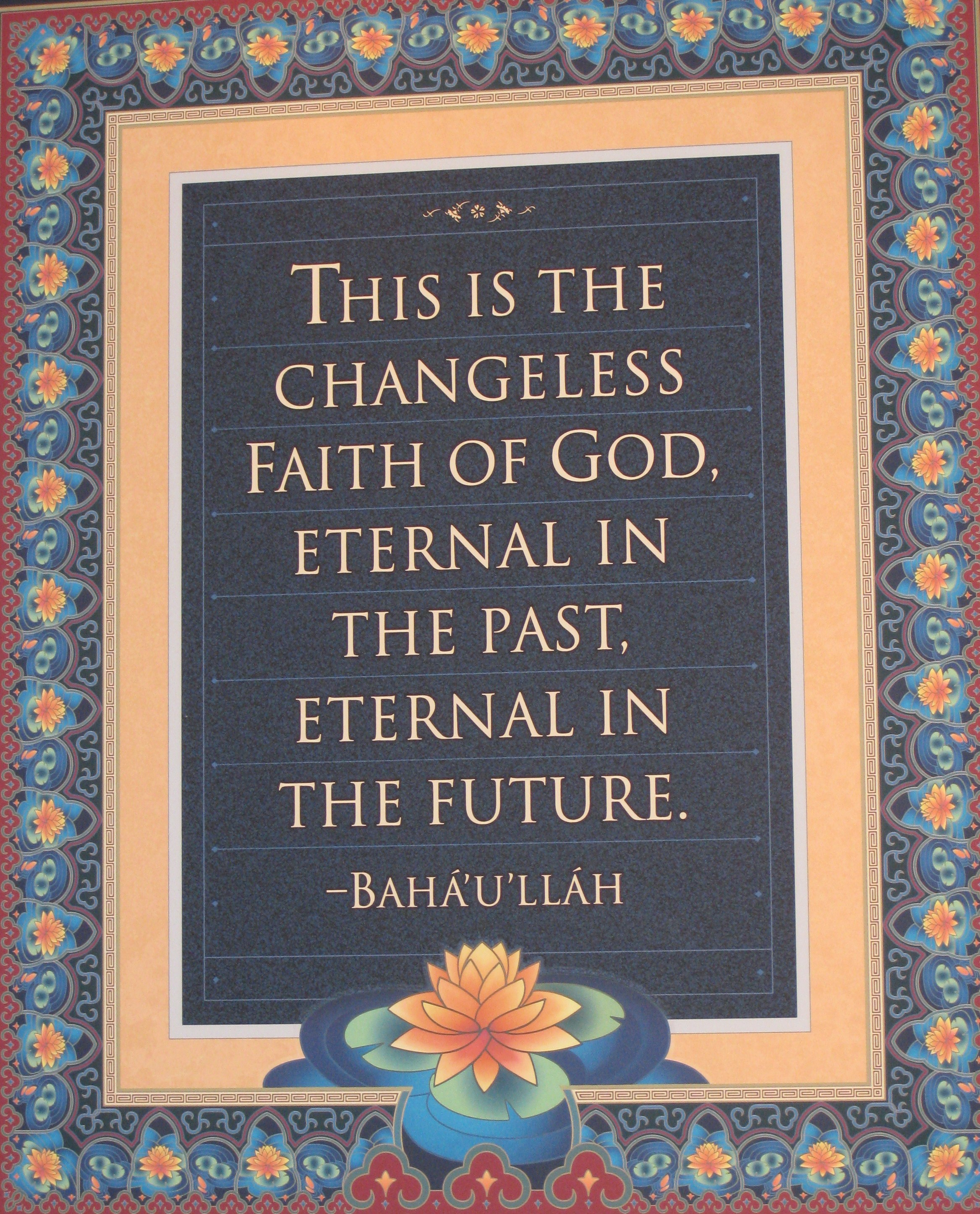
Words from Baháʼu'lláh

==== Mírzá Abu'l-Faḍl Gulpáygání ====
- Mírzá Abu'l-Faḍl Gulpáygání (1998). The Brilliant Proof. Los Angeles: Kalimát Press. ISBN 1-890688-00-2 – via Baháʼí Library Online.
- Mírzá Abu'l-Faḍl Gulpáygání (1981). Miracles and Metaphors. Los Angeles: Kalimát Press. ISBN 0-933770-22-7 – via Google Books.

==== Balyuzi, H.M. ====
- Balyuzi, H.M. (2001). ʻAbdu'l-Bahá: The Centre of the Covenant of Baháʼu'lláh. Oxford, UK: George Ronald. ISBN 0-85398-043-8.
- Balyuzi, H.M. (1973). The Báb: The Herald of the Day of Days. Oxford, UK: George Ronald. ISBN 0-85398-048-9.
- Balyuzi, H.M. (1980). Baháʼu'lláh, King of Glory. Oxford, UK: George Ronald. ISBN 0-85398-328-3.
- Balyuzi, H.M. (1970). Edward Granville Browne and the Baháʼí Faith. Oxford, UK: George Ronald. ISBN 0-85398-023-3.
- Balyuzi, H.M. (1985). Eminent Baháʼís in the time of Baháʼu'lláh. Oxford, UK: George Ronald. ISBN 0-85398-152-3.
- Balyuzi, H.M. (1981). Khadijih Bagum, the Wife of the Báb. Oxford, UK: George Ronald. ISBN 0-85398-100-0.
- Balyuzi, H.M. (1976). Muhammad and the Course of Islam. Oxford, UK: George Ronald. ISBN 0-85398-478-6.

==== Bahíyyih Khánum ====
- Khánum, Bahíyyih; et al. (1982). Research Department at the Baháʼí World Centre (ed.). Bahíyyih Khánum, the Greatest Holy Leaf: A Compilation from Baháʼí Sacred Texts and Writings of the Guardian of the Faith and Bahíyyih Khánum's Own Letters. Haifa, Israel: Baháʼí World Centre. ISBN 0-85398-131-0.

==== Esslemont, J.E. ====
- Esslemont, J.E. (1980). Baháʼu'lláh and the New Era (5th ed.). Wilmette, Illinois, USA: Baháʼí Publishing Trust. ISBN 0-87743-160-4.

==== Nabíl-i-Zarandí ====
- Nabíl-i-Zarandí (1932) [Composed 1890]. The Dawn-Breakers: Nabíl's Narrative. Translated by Shoghi Effendi (Hardcover ed.). Wilmette, Illinois, USA: Baháʼí Publishing Trust. ISBN 0-900125-22-5.

==== Rabbani, Rúhíyyih ====
- Rabbani, R., ed. (1992). The Ministry of the Custodians 1957-1963. Baháʼí World Centre. ISBN 0-85398-350-X – via Baháʼí Library Online.
- Rabbani, R. (1969). The Priceless Pearl (Hardcover ed.). London, UK: Baháʼí Publishing Trust: 2000. ISBN 1-870989-91-0.
- Rabbani, R. (1948). Twenty-Five Years of the Guardianship. Wilmette, Illinois, USA: Baháʼí Publishing Trust – via Baháʼí Library Online.

==== Taherzadeh, Adib ====
- Taherzadeh, A. (2000). The Child of the Covenant. Oxford, UK: George Ronald. ISBN 0-85398-439-5. Archived from the original on 2018-02-05 – via Baháʼí Library Online.
- Taherzadeh, A. (1992). The Covenant of Baháʼu'lláh. Oxford, UK: George Ronald. ISBN 0-85398-344-5.
- Taherzadeh, A. (1976). The Revelation of Baháʼu'lláh, Volume 1: Baghdad 1853-63. Oxford, UK: George Ronald. ISBN 0-85398-270-8.
- Taherzadeh, A. (1977). The Revelation of Baháʼu'lláh, Volume 2: Adrianople 1863-68. Oxford, UK: George Ronald. ISBN 0-85398-071-3.
- Taherzadeh, A. (1984). The Revelation of Baháʼu'lláh, Volume 3: ʻAkka, The Early Years 1868-77. Oxford, UK: George Ronald. ISBN 0-85398-144-2.
- Taherzadeh, A. (1987). The Revelation of Baháʼu'lláh, Volume 4: Mazra'ih & Bahji 1877-92. Oxford, UK: George Ronald. ISBN 0-85398-270-8.
- Taherzadeh, A. (1972). Trustees of the Merciful. London, UK: Baháʼí Publishing Trust. ISBN 0-900125-09-8. Archived from the original on 2018-02-22.

=== Periodicals ===
==== News ====
- The Baháʼí World (published since 1925 in various places), some volumes digitized online at bahaiworld.bahai.org (official website), bahai.works and at bahai-library.com, as well as some maps and charts.
- Star of the West, (published March 1910 to March 1935 in the United States), digitized online at several places including bahai.works, starofthewest.info, bahai-library.com
  - Titled Bahai [sic] News for Volume 1 (March 1910 to March 1911), Star of the West for Volumes 2–21 (March 1911 to March 1931), then The Baháʼí Magazine thereafter (Volumes 22–25)
  - Initially published in Chicago by the Baháʼí News Service, under the auspices of the Canada-United States Executive Committee for the Baháʼí Temple Unity, later published in Washington, D.C. by the National Spiritual Assembly of the United States and Canada.
- Baháʼí News (published Dec. 1924 to Oct. 1990 in the United States), digitized online at bahai.works, bahai-news.info, bahai-library.com
- The American Baháʼí (published since 1970 in the United States)
- Herald of the South (published since 1925 in New Zealand and Australia)
- Australian Baháʼí Report (published at least 1999–2006) in Australia, some issues of which were digitized and are archived online at archive.org

== See also ==
- Writings of Baháʼu'lláh
- Baháʼí Faith in fiction
