= Hasan M. Balyuzi =

Iranian Bahá'í and writer (1908–1980)

Hasan M. Balyuzi (7 September 1908 – 12 February 1980) was a prominent Iranian member of the Baháʼí Faith. He served in administrative institutions of the religion for decades, worked for the BBC, and was a prolific writer. He produced innumerable articles and a series of scholarly books on Muhammad and the central figures of the Bahá'í dispensation: the Báb, Bahá'u'lláh and ʻAbdu'l-Bahá. His consecration to serving the Faith, and his deep spirituality led to his being named a Hand of the Cause in 1957. He established a trust and a library for Bahá'í research and donated his works to it. The library contains more than 10 thousand items and continues to grow.

== Biography ==
Balyuzi was born in Shiraz, Iran, but he spent most of his life in Britain. Balyuzi was an Afnán, a descendant of the Báb, on both sides of his family. His father became governor of the Persian Gulf ports. The family was exiled to India during WWI where he spent from about age 8 through 16, and there was tutored in Persian, Arabic, went to "Bishops College" of the Roman Catholic Diocese of Poona. Later Balyuzi's family moved back to Iran when his father became Minister of the Interior; Balyuzi attended school in Cyprus. His father died in 1921, his mother moved to Shiraz, and Edward G. Browne assisted in arranging his education in London about a year before his father died. Balyuzi then went on to Beirut and prepared for college.

While living in Beirut, Balyuzi met Shoghi Effendi at a time he considered himself a Muslim. He found a copy of Some Answered Questions and read other papers on the religion but remained skeptical. However, as the relationship between himself and Effendi grew he found the need to join the religion at age 17, in November, 1925. He then attended American University of Beirut and advanced with a degree in chemistry and then a Masters of Arts in Diplomatic History along with various sports of student societies. In 1932 he went to Britain where he studied diplomatic history at the London School of Economics and earned a Master of Science degree in 1935. Meanwhile, in 1933-4 Balyuzi wrote an article for a Persian newspaper commenting about politics in Europe and Shoghi Effendi wrote a warning about involvement in politics and this was to have a decisive impact on his life. At Ridván 1933 he was elected as a member of the National Spiritual Assembly of Great Britain, where he was re-elected until 1958 and served as Vice-Chair and later served as Chair. In 1938 he was the lead actor in a dramatic presentation in a play adaption of the Seven Valleys. It was also in 1938 that he began to publish a biographical article on Baháʼu'lláh, followed by the Báb and ʻAbdu'l-Bahá, and later these would expand into books.

From around 1942 he worked with the Persian Section of the BBC until 1958 presenting programs on Iran and Persian history. Along the way he married Mary Brown and they had five sons. He also traveled the country often giving lectures. In October 1957 he was appointed a Hand of the Cause of God by Shoghi Effendi.

He began to write books from 1970 starting with one on Edward Granville Browne. In 1976 he wrote "Muhammad and the Course of Islam" and Moojan Momen became his assistant. His books, especially this "Course of Islam" text, have been donated to libraries, and used as part of lectures and in discussions.

Balyuzi died in London on 12 February 1980.

== Establishments in his memory ==
=== Afnan Library ===
He left instructions that an Afnan Library Trust for Baháʼí Faith research be established and contributed his own library of materials to it. The library, located in Sandy near Cambridge, United Kingdom, opened in 2015 with over 10,000 items on diverse topics and had received further donations of materials. Moojan Momen is one of the Afnan Library's trustees.

=== Memorial Lectures of the Association of Baháʼí Studies ===
A memorial lecture series was named after him held by the Association of Baháʼí Studies for North America.

Previous Hasan M. Balyuzi lecturers:

- 2016: Farzam Arbab
- 2015: Nazila Ghanea
- 2014: Vahid Rafati
- 2013: Layli Miller-Muro
- 2012: Shapour Rassekh
- 2011: Nader Saiedi
- 2010: Julio Savi
- 2009: Otto Don Rogers
- 2008: Houshmand Fatheazam
- 2007: Will van den Hoonaard
- 2006: Janet Khan
- 2005: John Hatcher
- 2004: Ali Nakhjavani
- 2003: Suheil Bushrui
- 2002: Udo Schaefer
- 2001: Fariborz Sahba and Hossein Amanat
- 2000: Bahiyyih Nakhjavani
- 1999: Richard Thomas
- 1998: William S. Hatcher
- 1997: Dorothy Nelson
- 1996: Ross Woodman
- 1995: Amin Banani
- 1994: David Ruhe
- 1993: Abbas Amanat
- 1991: David Hofman
- 1990: Helen Elsie Austin
- 1988: Moojan Momen
- 1986: Adib Taherzadeh
- 1985: Dorothy Freeman
- 1984: David Hofman
- 1983: Firuz Kazemzadeh
- 1982: Gayle Morrison
- 1981: Douglas Martin, Glenford Mitchell
- 1980: Abbas Afnan, Muhammad Afnan

== Works ==
- Balyuzi, Hasan (2001). ʻAbdu'l-Bahá: The Centre of the Covenant of Baháʼu'lláh (Paperback ed.). Oxford, UK: George Ronald. ISBN 0-85398-043-8.
- Balyuzi, Hasan (1973). The Báb: The Herald of the Day of Days. Oxford, UK: George Ronald. ISBN 0-85398-048-9.
- Balyuzi, Hasan (1980). Baháʼu'lláh, King of Glory (Paperback ed.). Oxford, UK: George Ronald. ISBN 0-85398-328-3.
- Balyuzi, Hasan (1963). Baháʼu'lláh: The Word Made Flesh (Paperback ed.). Oxford, UK: George Ronald. ISBN 978-0-85398-001-8.
- Balyuzi, Hasan (1981). Khadijih Bagum, the Wife of the Báb. Oxford, UK: George Ronald. ISBN 0-85398-100-0.
- Balyuzi, Hasan (1970). Edward Granville Browne and the Baháʼí Faith. Oxford, UK: George Ronald. ISBN 0-85398-023-3.
- Balyuzi, Hasan (1985). Eminent Baháʼís in the time of Baháʼu'lláh. The Camelot Press Ltd, Southampton. ISBN 0-85398-152-3.
- Balyuzi, Hasan (1976). Muhammad and the Course of Islam. Oxford, UK: George Ronald. ISBN 0-85398-478-6.
- Balyuzi, Hasan (1982). Studies in Babi and Baha'i History, Vol. 1. Los Angeles: Kalimat Press. ISBN 978-0-933770-16-4.
