= Days of Remembrance =

Collection of writings of Baháʼu'lláh, related to nine Baháʼí Holy Days

Days of Remembrance is a book containing authorized English translations of writings of Baháʼu'lláh, founder of the Baháʼí Faith related to nine Baháʼí Holy Days, namely Naw-Rúz, Ridván, Declaration of the Báb, Ascension of Baháʼu'lláh, Martyrdom of the Báb, Birth of the Báb and of Baháʼu'lláh. The book was first published by the Baháʼí World Centre in January 2017.

Included are 45 prayers and tablets, occasionally with repeating refrains, among which are the below titled texts.

== Ridván ==
Almost half of the volume (96 pages) is taken up by 20 Tablets related to Ridván, including:

- Húr-i-ʻUjáb (Tablet of the Wondrous Maiden; 1856–63)
- Lawh-i-ʻÁshiq va Maʻshúq (Tablet of the Lover and the Beloved)
- Súriy-i-Qalam (Súrih of the Pen; c. 1865)

== Declaration of the Báb ==
- Lawh-i-Náqús (Tablet of the Bell; 1863)
- Lawh-i-Ghulámu'l-Khuld (Tablet of the Immortal Youth; 1856–63)

== Ascension of Baháʼu'lláh ==
- Súriy-i-Ghusn (Tablet of the Branch; 1863–68)
- Lawh-i-Rasúl (Tablet to Rasúl)
- Lawh-i-Maryam (Tablet to Maryam)
- Kitáb-i-'Ahd (Book of the Covenant; 1879–91)
- The Tablet of Visitation

== Birth of Baháʼu'lláh ==
- Lawh-i-Mawlúd (Tablet of the Birth)

== Martyrdom of the Báb ==
From the following tablets excerpts are included:

- Súriy-i-Nush (Súrih of Counsel; 1857–63)
- Súriy-i-Mulúk (Súrih of the Kings; 1867–68)
- Lawh-i-Salmán I (Tablet to Salmán I; 1864)
- Súriy-i-Dhikr (Súrih of Remembrance)
- Súriy-i-Ahzán (Súrih of Sorrows; 1867–68)

== See also ==
- List of writings of Baháʼu'lláh
- Prayer in the Baháʼí Faith

== Bibliography ==
- Baháʼu'lláh (2017). Days of Remembrance. Haifa, Israel: Baháʼí World Centre. ISBN 978-0-87743-380-4.
