= The Cloud of Unknowing (disambiguation) =

The Cloud of Unknowing is a 14th-century guidebook by an anonymous English monk.

The Cloud of Unknowing may also refer to:

- Rashḥ-i-ʻAmá ("Sprinkling of the Cloud of Unknowing"), first known text of Bahá’u’lláh, founder of the Bahá'í Faith
- The title of one of the sections in the 1997 novel by Don DeLillo, Underworld
- The Cloud of Unknowing (album), a 2007 album by James Blackshaw
- The Cloud of Unknowing (EP), a 2026 EP by Sepultura
- "The Cloud of Unknowing", a song by Current 93 from the 1994 album Of Ruine or Some Blazing Starre
- "Cloud of Unknowing", a song by Gorillaz from the 2010 album Plastic Beach
- "Cloud of Unknowing", a song by Swans from the 2016 album The Glowing Man
