= Nineteen Day Feast =

Regular community gatherings in the Bahá'í Faith

Nineteen Day Feasts are regular community gatherings, occurring on the first day of each month of the Baháʼí calendar (and are often nineteen days apart from each other). Each gathering consists of a Devotional, Administrative, and Social part. The devotional part of the Nineteen Day Feast can be compared to Sunday Services in Christianity, Friday Prayers in Islam, or Saturday Prayers in Judaism; however, the Baháʼí Faith has no clergy nor is congregational prayer performed at these meetings.

== Purpose ==
Baháʼís see the Feast in both practical and spiritual terms. It is both an administrative meeting, and at the same time it is an uplifting spiritual event, and thus it has a central purpose to the Baháʼí community life.

The Nineteen Day Feast serves to increase the unity of the community, and spiritually uplift the community members by having a devotional program, where readings and prayers from the Baháʼí holy writings are shared, and a social program where community members can socialize.

"As to the Nineteen Day Feast, it rejoiceth mind and heart. If this feast be held in the proper fashion, the friends will, once in nineteen days, find themselves spiritually restored, and endued with a power that is not of this world."

ʻAbdu'l-Bahá: Selection from the Writings of ʻAbdu'l-Bahá, p. 91

As an administrative meeting, the Feast provides an opportunity for the community to report news, or other salient items of interest to the community, and allows for communication and consultation between the community and the Local Spiritual Assembly.

"...The main purpose of the Nineteen Day Feasts is to enable individual believers to offer any suggestion to the Local Assembly which in its turn will pass it to the National Spiritual Assembly. The Local Assembly is, therefore, the proper medium through which local Baháʼí communities can communicate with body of the national representative..."

From letter written on behalf of Shoghi Effendi to the National Spiritual Assembly of the United States and Canada, November 18, 1933

While attending the Nineteen Day Feast is not obligatory, its importance is stressed since it allows for consultation between the individual members, the community and the Local Spiritual Assembly, as well as increasing the unity of the community.

"In regard to the Nineteen Day feasts, Shoghi Effendi is of the opinion that the believers should be impressed with the importance of attending these gatherings which, in addition to their spiritual significance, constitute a vital medium for maintaining close and continued contact between the believers themselves, and also between them and the body of their elected representatives in the local community."

Letter written on behalf of Shoghi Effendi, 22 December 1934

== Structure ==
The Feast should, if possible, begin on the first day of the new month of the Baháʼí calendar. Attendance is considered a spiritual responsibility, but is not obligatory. The meeting can vary in style between any two communities, but each must have the same format - a devotional portion, followed by a community consultation, followed by a period of socialization. Quite often there is food served, though this is not a requirement. The different portions should not regularly be given undue weight. However, Shoghi Effendi cautioned against too many set forms, or allowing any particular cultural form to become rigid:

The further away the friends keep from any set forms, the better, for they must realize that the Cause is absolutely universal, and what might seem beautiful addition to their mode of celebrating a Feast, etc., would perhaps fall on the ears of people of another country as unpleasant sound - - and vice versa.

From a letter written on behalf of Shoghi Effendi to the National Spiritual Assembly of the United States and Canada, July 20, 1946

=== Devotional Portion ===
The devotional portion is seen as a means to uplift the spiritual character of the community, and put the members in a spiritual frame of mind, for their own sakes, and so that this spiritual atmosphere may permeate their consultations. The devotional portion usually consists of the reading of prayers and excerpts from the Baháʼí writings. The arts, especially music, have been highly encouraged by Shoghi Effendi in this portion.

...the Feast is opened with devotional readings, that is to say prayers and meditations, from the Writings of Baháʼu'lláh, the Báb and the Master. Following this passages may be read from other Tablets, from the Holy Scriptures of previous Dispensations...

From letter of the Universal House of Justice to the Hands of the Cause of God, August 25, 1965

=== Administrative Portion ===
Baháʼís are encouraged to consult on all important matters, and the Nineteen Day Feast provides an opportunity to do so. The members also report news, or other salient items of interest to the community. This portion is also the primary outlet of communication between the community and its Local Spiritual Assembly, and recommendations to that body are often consulted upon in the Nineteen Day Feast.

During the administrative portion Baháʼís are asked to consult in a specific manner, termed Baháʼí consultation, where people put aside prejudices and personal attitudes and rather fully explore the matters under consultation.

The Feast is a critical arena for democratic expression within a Baháʼí Community. Baháʼís from other communities may freely attend, though they may not vote on any recommendations that the community may put forward as recommendations to the Local Spiritual Assembly.

Previously if a non-Baháʼí attended the Feast, guidance was given that the administrative part of the feast should be omitted, or the non-Baháʼí was asked to step outside of the room during the administrative portion of the feast. more recent guidance from the Universal House of Justice has since allowed for the administrative portion of a feast to take place should a non-Baháʼí attend.

"The House of Justice has decided that, in such instances, rather than eliminating the administrative portion completely or asking the visitors to withdraw, those conducting the programme can modify this part of the Feast to accommodate the guests.

"The sharing of local and national news and information about social events, as well as consultation on topics of general interest, such as the teaching work, service projects, the Fund, and so on, can take place as usual, while discussion of sensitive or problematic issues related to these or other topics can be set aside for another time when the friends can express themselves freely without being inhibited by the presence of visitors.

From a letter of the Universal House of Justice to all National Spiritual Assemblies, May 17, 2009

=== Social Portion ===
The social portion of the feast is normally accompanied by some refreshments although refreshments can be served at any point. It is the responsibility of the host to provide and personally serve something, even if this simply consists of water.

== Responsibilities ==
=== Spiritual Assembly ===
It is the responsibility of Local Spiritual Assemblies to ensure that the Nineteen Day Feast is held.

=== Individual ===
Attendance at the Nineteen Day Feast is not obligatory, but is considered a duty and a privilege for Baháʼís since it is where they can enter into consultation with the rest of the community.

"Attendance at Nineteen Day Feasts is not Obligatory but very important, and every believer should consider it a duty and a privilege to present on such occasions."

From letter written on behalf of The Guardian to an individual believer, December 15, 1947

== Parallels ==
=== Christianity ===
The Nineteen Day Feast is described by ʻAbdu'l-Bahá as "The Lord's Supper", likening it to the Last Supper in Christianity. In this sense, participation at Feast can be seen as slightly analogous to the Christian practice of Communion, though only in the sense that it should provide fellowship and connection between the faithful, God, and each other. This communal sharing of commitment and memory is crucial to both Christian communion, and to the Baháʼí Feast.

"Make ye an effort in every meeting that the Lord's Supper may become realised and the heavenly food descend. This heavenly food is knowledge, understanding, faith, assurance, love, affinity, kindness, purity of purpose, attraction of hearts and the union of souls ... When the meeting is conducted after this manner, then ʻAbdu'l-Bahá also is present in heart and soul, though His body may not be with you."

ʻAbdu'l-Bahá: Baháʼí World Faith, pp. 407–408

"And he took bread, and gave thanks, and brake it, and gave unto them, saying, This is my body which is given for you: this do in remembrance of me."

King James Bible, Luke 22:19

== See also ==
- Baháʼí administration
- Spiritual Assembly
- Universal House of Justice
