= Amoz Gibson =

Member of the Universal House of Justice

- Born: August 3, 1918; Washington, D.C., United States
- Died: May 18, 1982 (aged 63); Haifa, Israel
- Known for: Member of the Universal House of Justice

Amoz Everett Gibson (August 3, 1918 – May 18, 1982) was an African American member of the Universal House of Justice, the supreme religious authority of the Baháʼí Faith.

== Early life ==
Amoz Gibson was born in Washington, D.C. to William and Deborah Gibson. His father William Gibson, studied as a minister at Howard University and became a Christian Science practitioner but had adopted the Bahá'í Faith together with his wife in 1912. Although Amoz attended children's classes of the Bahá'í Faith and attended Feasts with his father, he himself only joined the Bahá'í Faith in 1944.

Gibson obtained his Bachelor of Science in education with a major in social studies at the Miner Teachers College (now the University of the District of Columbia). He married Mary Elizabeth Lane in 1941. Gibson worked at the Washington Navy Yard and was drafted into the army in 1944, serving in the European and Pacific theatres in a segregated regiment.

== Bahá'í activism ==
Following his return from the war in 1946, Gibson became an active member in the Bahá'í community of Washington, D.C., serving in the Local Spiritual Assembly, regional committees and as a delegate at the Bahá'í national convention of the United States.

He and his family moved to Mexico while he studied at Mexico City College (now Universidad de las Américas, A.C.) under the G.I. Bill. He obtained his master's degree in geography in 1951. Returning to Washington, Amoz taught geography at public school and later at Miner Teachers College.

In 1953, Shoghi Effendi, the leader of the Bahá'í Faith, encouraged Bahá'ís to 'pioneer', i.e. to become missionaries of the faith. In 1955, the Gibsons followed that call, moving to the Navajo Nation in Arizona. There they taught in schools whilst educating the local population about the Bahá'í Faith. The first Navajo to adopt the Bahá'í Faith was Sadye Joe, in 1957. Other Bahá'í pioneers later settled on the Navajo Nation and Hopi Reservation as well as in nearby towns.

After four years on the reservation, Gibson moved to Gallup, New Mexico and took a job teaching English at Fort Wingate. He was appointed principal of Bread Springs Day School in 1960.

One of Gibson's notable achievements in his activities on the reservation included organizing the visit of Rúhíyyih Khánum, the wife of Shoghi Effendi, to the reservation in 1960. The visit encouraged broader local awareness of the Bahá'í Faith and stimulated new activities. In 1962, Gibson organized a conference of a thousand Bahá'í supporters at Pine Springs, Arizona, which was attended by the Hand of the Cause, Dhikru'llah Khadem.

In 1959, Gibson was named to the Auxiliary Board for protection, an institution responsible for overseeing the protection and propagation of the religion. In 1960, he was elected to the National Spiritual Assembly of the United States. He represented the board on trips throughout the United States and in Jamaica, Haiti, and Uganda.

== Universal House of Justice ==
In 1963, when attending the first Bahá'í International Convention in Haifa, Israel, Gibson was elected to the first Universal House of Justice, the supreme ruling body of the worldwide Bahá'í movement. Gibson subsequently relocated to Haifa with his family, arriving in July 1963. He was appointed as Convener of the Department of Holy Places and was heavily involved in the structural designs and maintenance of the Bahá'í Shrines in Haifa. Gibson continued to teach while travelling across the globe, visiting Baha’i communities in Europe, America and the Middle East.

== Illness and death ==
Gibson was diagnosed with acute lymphoblastic leukaemia in August 1980. Although treatment caused his illness to go into remission for a year, it became apparent that the diagnosis was terminal. In the final year of his life, Gibson visited his children some of whom were ‘pioneering’ Bahá'í teachings around the world. He resigned from the Universal House of Justice shortly before his death. He died on May 14 in Haifa.

On May 15, the Universal House of Justice notified the international Bahá'í community of Gibson's death:

With sorrowful hearts lament loss our dearly-loved brother Amoz Gibson who passed away after prolonged heroic struggle fatal illness. Exemplary self-sacrificing promoter faith achieved brilliant unblemished record constant service founded on rocklike staunchness and deep insatiable love for teaching work particularly among Indian and black minorities western hemisphere and indigenous peoples Africa. His notable work administrative fields North America crowned final nineteen years incalculable contribution development world centre world embracing faith. Praying shrines bountiful reward his noble soul throughout progress Abha Kingdom. Express loving sympathy valiant beloved widow partner his services and bereaved children. Advise hold befitting memorial gatherings everywhere Bahá'í world and commemorative services all Mashriqul Adhkars.
