= Fire Tablet =

1871 text by Baháʼu'lláh

Lawh-i-Qad-Ihtaraqa'l-Mukhlisun, better known as the Fire Tablet, is a tablet written in Arabic by Baháʼu'lláh, founder of the Baháʼí Faith, in Akká in 1871. Baháʼu'lláh wrote the tablet in response to questions by a Baháʼí believer from Iran. The authorized English translation was done in 1980 by Adib Taherzadeh and a Committee at the Baháʼí World Centre.

The tablet is written in rhyming verse, has the form of a conversation between Baháʼu'lláh and God, and reflects the sufferings of Baháʼu'lláh. Baháʼís often recite this tablet in times of difficulty.

== See also ==
- Long Healing Prayer
- Tablet of Ahmad (Arabic)
- Tablet of the Holy Mariner
- Prayer in the Baháʼí Faith

== Sources ==
- Baháʼu'lláh (1991) [First published 1871]. The Fire Tablet. Wilmette, Illinois, USA: Baháʼí Publishing Trust. ISBN 087743285-6 – via Internet Archive.
- Taherzadeh, A. (1984). The Revelation of Baháʼu'lláh, Volume 3: ʻAkka, The Early Years 1868-77. Oxford, UK: George Ronald. ISBN 0-85398-144-2.
