= Síyáh-Chál =

Dungeon in Tehran, Iran

Coordinates: 35°40′47″N 51°25′13″E

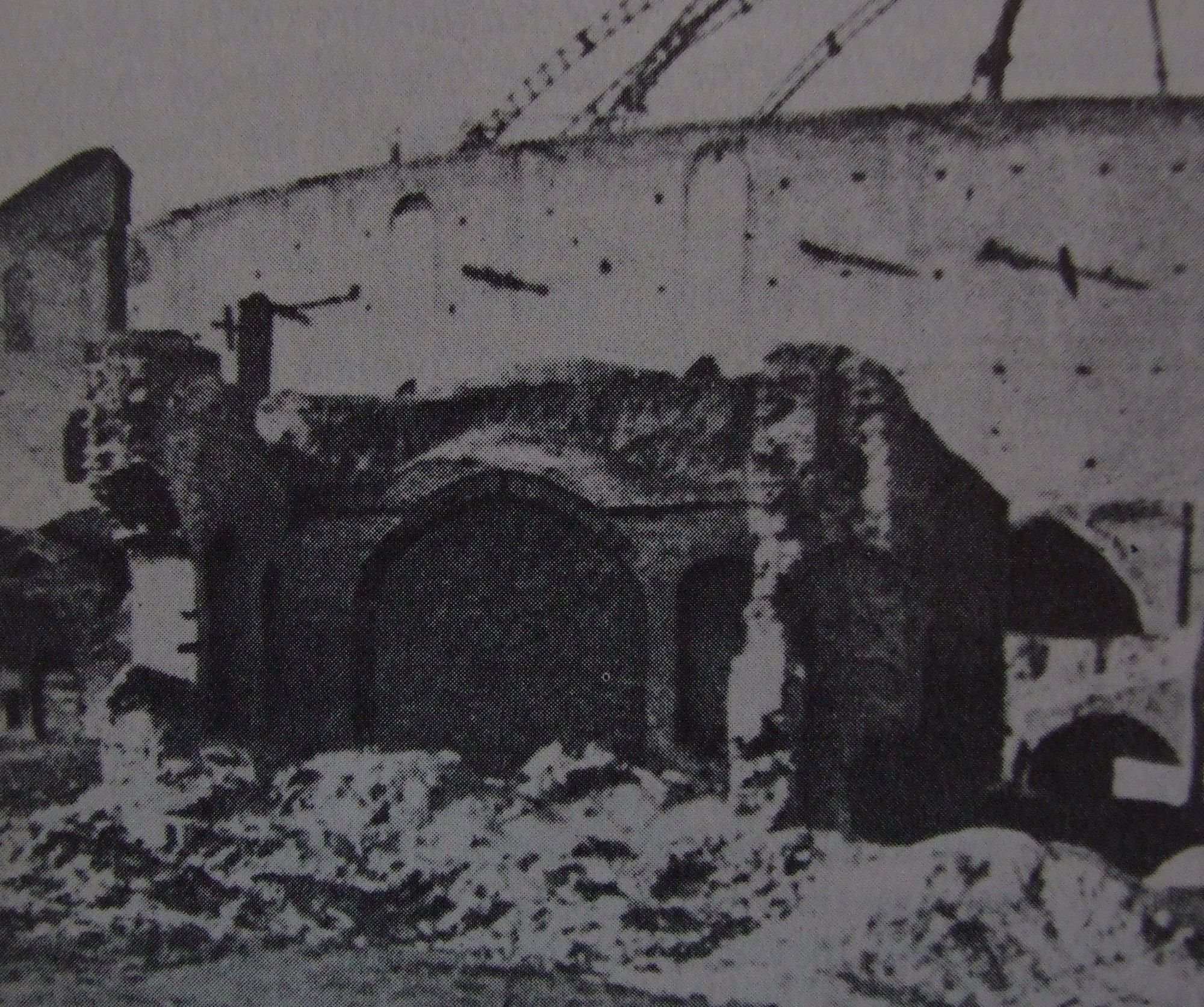
Original corridor to the entrance of the Síyáh-Chál in Tehran.

The Síyáh-Chál (Persian: سیاه چال, lit. 'Black pit') was a subterrenean dungeon southeast of Golestan Palace in Tehran. It carries a significant role in the history of the Baháʼí Faith, because its founder, Baháʼu'lláh was held there for four months in 1852, and it is where he claimed to have received a revelation. The Síyáh-Chál is regarded as the second holiest place in Iran to Baháʼís, after the house of the Báb, in Shiraz.

The pit was a discarded cistern converted into a dungeon. It had three flights of steep stairs descending into an area that received no light. There was no functioning latrine, and the small area was filled with up to 150 men.

On 15 August 1852, a radical group of Bábís attempted to assassinate Naser al-Din Shah Qajar and failed. The group of Bábís linked with the plan were rounded up and executed, but notwithstanding the assassins' claim that they were working alone, the entire Bábí community was blamed, precipitating a pogrom against the Bábí community that was encouraged and orchestrated by the government. During this time many Bábís were killed, and about 30, including Baháʼu'lláh, were imprisoned in the Síyáh-Chál along with many criminals.

According to Baháʼu'lláh, it was during this four-month imprisonment in appalling conditions that he had several mystical experiences, and received a vision of a maiden, through whom he received his mission as a messenger of God and as the one whose coming the Báb had prophesied. It was also the place where he composed his first known tablet, the Rashḥ-i-ʻAmá.

The ambassador of the Russian Empire requested that Baháʼu'lláh and others apparently unconnected with the conspiracy be spared. After he had been in the Síyáh-Chál for four months, Baháʼu'lláh was released on the condition that he would leave Iran.

In 1868, the dungeon was filled-in and the Takyeh Dowlat, a royal theatre, was built over the site. The site was Baháʼí property from 1954 until the Iranian Revolution of 1979.

== Maid of Heaven ==
In October 1852, after two months had passed in the dungeon, Baháʼu'lláh described his vision in the Síyáh-Chál as a 'Maid of Heaven' (Persian: حوری, romanized: ḥuri, lit. 'houri'). He described his experiences in the Epistle to the Son of the Wolf and Súriy-i-Haykal. For example, in the Súriy-i-Haykal he wrote:

While engulfed in tribulations I heard a most wondrous, a most sweet voice, calling above My head. Turning My face, I beheld a Maiden — the embodiment of the remembrance of the name of My Lord — suspended in the air before Me. So rejoiced was she in her very soul that her countenance shone with the ornament of the good-pleasure of God, and her cheeks glowed with the brightness of the All-Merciful. Betwixt Earth and Heaven she was raising a call which captivated the hearts and minds of men. She was imparting to both My inward and outer being tidings which rejoiced My soul, and the souls of God's honoured servants. Pointing with her finger unto My head, she addressed all who are in Heaven and all who are on Earth saying: "By God! This is the best beloved of the worlds, and yet ye comprehend not. This is the Beauty of God amongst you, and the power of His sovereignty within you, could ye but understand.

The Maid of Heaven also appears in several tablets of Baháʼu'lláh's, including Tablet of the Maiden (Lawh-i-Húrí), Tablet of the Deathless Youth (Lawh-i-Ghulámu'l-Khuld), Tablet of the Wondrous Maiden (Húr-i-'Ujáb), Tablet of the Holy Mariner (Lawh-i-Malláhu'l-Quds) (all written in the Baghdad period 1856–63), the Súrih of the Pen (Súriy-i-Qalam; c. 1865) and the Tablet of the Vision (Lawh-i-Ruʼyá; 1873).

Hatcher and Hemmat interpret the different occurrences of the Maid of Heaven throughout the writings of Bahá'u'lláh as the gradual unveiling of the station of Bahá'u'lláh. Sours describes parallels with Sophia, the personification of Wisdom in the Wisdom literature in the Bible. John Walbridge categorized her appearance under four themes: 'the maiden revealed' as the personification of the spirit of God, 'the maiden in love' as a bride personifying his coming revelation, 'the maiden heartbroken' in sorrow and grief over impending exile and of internal and external enemies, and 'the maiden afterwards' representing healing of spiritual wounds and the increasing tranquility of Bahá'u'lláh's later years.

The Guardian of the Baháʼí Faith, Shoghi Effendi, compares the Maid of Heaven with the Holy Spirit as manifested in the burning bush of Moses, the Dove to Jesus, and the angel Gabriel to Muhammad. Further, Farshid Kazemi discusses links with the Zoroastrian divine personification Daena. Effendi wrote about the Maiden in God Passes By: "He lauded the names and attributes of His Creator, extolled the glories and mysteries of His own Revelation, sang the praises of that Maiden that personified the Spirit of God within Him".
