= Tablet of the Holy Mariner =

1863 text by Baháʼu'lláh

Lawh-i-Malláhu'l-Quds or the Tablet of the Holy Mariner is a tablet written by Baháʼu'lláh, founder of the Baháʼí Faith, in Baghdad in 1863. The tablet's main theme is the covenant between man and God, and man being unfaithful to it.

The tablet is written in two parts; one which is in Arabic, and the other in Persian; currently only the Arabic part has been translated into English. The Persian tablet is for the most part similar in content to the Arabic tablet. The tablet is written in allegorical terms and its main theme is the covenant and man being unfaithful to it. In the tablet, Baháʼu'lláh refers to himself as the "Holy Mariner," uses an "ark" to symbolize the Covenant of God, and symbolized the believers in the covenant as the "dwellers" in the "ark;" he writes that those people who are in the ark are safe and will acquire salvation. In the tablet, Baháʼu'lláh also alludes to his perceived station as He whom God shall make manifest, a messianic figure predicted by the Báb, and the fate of Subh-i-Azal, Baháʼu'lláh's half-brother who wanted to cause a split in the Bábí community.

The tablet was written on March 27, 1863; after the tablet was written, Baháʼu'lláh's amanuensis came out of Baháʼu'lláh's tent and read the tablet to his followers. It is stated that at this point it was evident to Baháʼu'lláh's followers that their time in Baghdad would be shortly over. Shortly thereafter, Baháʼu'lláh was summoned by the Ottoman government from Baghdad to Constantinople (present-day Istanbul); before leaving Baghdad, he entered the garden of Ridván, where he publicly stated his claimed prophethood.

== See also ==
- Fire Tablet
- Long Healing Prayer
- Tablet of Ahmad (Arabic)
- Prayer in the Baháʼí Faith
