= Rashḥ-i-ʻAmá =

First known text written by Baháʼu'lláh in 1852

Ras͟hḥ-i-ʻAmá ("The Clouds of the Realms Above" or "Sprinkling of the Cloud of Unknowing") is the first known tablet written by Baháʼu'lláh, founder of the Baháʼí Faith, in 1852. It is also the only known tablet of Baháʼu'lláh written in Qajar dynasty Persia. It is a poem of 20 couplets in Persian, written when Baháʼu'lláh was imprisoned in the Síyáh-Chál in Tehran.

In February 2019 an authorized translation was published by the Baháʼí World Centre in the collection The Call of the Divine Beloved.
