= Tablet of Visitation =

Specific prayers used in the Baháʼí Faith to commemorate the founders of the Faith

Tablets of Visitation are specific prayers used in the Baháʼí Faith while visiting the shrines of its founders or martyrs. The Báb, Baháʼu'lláh and ʻAbdu'l-Bahá wrote many such Tablets of Visitation.

The Tablet of Visitation for the Báb and Baháʼu'lláh is a prayer used during visits to the Shrine of Baháʼu'lláh and of the Báb, and is also used during Baháʼí Holy Days associated with them. The Tablet is composed of passages taken from several of Baháʼu'lláh's writings.

There is also a Tablet of Visitation for ʻAbdu'l-Bahá, which is a prayer expressing humility and selflessness.

== See also ==
- Ziyarat
