= Tablet of Ahmad (Arabic) =

Bahá'í text

The Tablet of Ahmad (or Lawh-i-Ahmad) is a tablet written by Baháʼu'lláh, the founder of the Baháʼí Faith, while he was in Adrianople. While the exact date is not known, the Tablet is believed to have been written in 1865 to a Baháʼí from Yazd, Iran, named Ahmad. Baháʼís often recite it as a prayer to dispel afflictions and inspire perseverance in the face of hardships. In a letter written on his behalf, Shoghi Effendi stated that it has been 'invested by Baháʼu'lláh with a special potency and significance'.

The language and content of the Tablet are nuanced and interrelated, with references to core Bábí and Bahá'í hermeneutics. It announces the station of the Báb as "the King of the Messengers," and that of Bahá'u'lláh as "that Most Great Beauty, foretold in the Books of the Messengers," and the "Tree of Life that bringeth forth the fruits of God", which echoes the book of Revelation, 22:1-2. The four states mentioned as suitable for responding to the message of God, which lead to recognition of God's Messengers, are described as: sincerity, belief in the divine unity (the approach to God as manifested in the founders of the world religions is the same as approach to God), severance, and love. The freedom of individual conscience is reinforced in the pursuit of God and His Messengers, while obedience to the ordinances of God is enjoined, and that the truth of every command God ordains in these directives will be tested in one's life. Bahá'u'lláh then refers to His own tribulations and calls on Ahmad to rely upon God and to be steadfast in his love in times of difficulty and persecution. Bahá'u'lláh calls on Ahmad to "be thou as a flame of fire to My enemies," and "a river of life eternal to My loved ones" in response to his own suffering from the superstitions and oppression of others. The "flame of fire" refers to being steadfast in the truth, and unassailable as a flame, in the face of difficulties caused by others, while the "river of life" refers to becoming a source of inspiration, guidance, and edification to those who believe in the message of unity. The Tablet appears to revolve around the theme of transforming suffering into these virtuous qualities, symbolized as "fire" and "light", and "the fruits of God." Bahá'u'lláh concludes the Tablet by enjoining Ahmad to "learn well" the lessons contained in the Tablet and not to withhold himself from their benefit. The special role of sincerity in life is disclosed in the text, not only as a condition for recognition of the "nearness of God," but as the condition that leads to the relief of sadness and the resolution of difficulties. The Tablet can be seen as the outline of Bahá'u'lláh's theodicy, and is, therefore, used as a guide in times of personal trial to align one's inner life with the truths that "will be tested" in the process of turning "fire" of personal suffering into "light."

== See also ==
- Fire Tablet
- Long Healing Prayer
- Tablet of the Holy Mariner
- Prayer in the Baháʼí Faith
