= Long Healing Prayer =

Prayer written by Baháʼu'lláh

Lawh-i-Anta'l-Kafi or the Long Healing Prayer (also known as Lawh-i-Shifá and Lawh al-Shafá al-Tawíl) is a prayer written in Arabic by Baháʼu'lláh, founder of the Baháʼí Faith, in the 'Akká period. The authorized English translation was done in 1980 by Habib Taherzadeh and a Committee at the Baháʼí World Centre.

The main part of the prayer consists of numerous rhythmic invocations of God, each ending with the phrase "Thou the Sufficing, Thou the Healing, Thou the Abiding, O Thou Abiding One."

The prayer ends with a supplication for healing and protection, and includes the phrase "protect the bearer of this blessed Tablet, and whoso reciteth it, and whoso cometh upon it, and whoso passeth around the house wherein it is. Heal Thou, then, by it every sick, diseased and poor one", which gives this prayer its talismanic nature.

== In music ==
Norwegian composer Lasse Thoresen composed a piece of choral music for the Bergen International Music Festival in May 1996, in which the Long Healing Prayer was sung, first in the original Arabic and then in English.

== Other Baháʼí healing prayers ==
Baháʼu'lláh wrote several other healing prayers, including a prayer for women, one for infants, and a well-known short prayer starting with the phrase "Thy Name is my healing", which is part of Baháʼu'lláh's Lawh-i-Tibb (Tablet to a Physician). There is also a prayer for protection from "calamity and pestilence" (epidemics).

== See also ==
- Fire Tablet
- Tablet of Ahmad (Arabic)
- Tablet of the Holy Mariner
- Prayer in the Baháʼí Faith

== Bibliography ==
- Baháʼu'lláh (1862). Long Healing Prayer. Wilmette, Illinois: Baháʼí Publishing Trust: 1991. ISBN 0877432856.
