= Universal House of Justice =

Elected institution governing the worldwide Baháʼí community

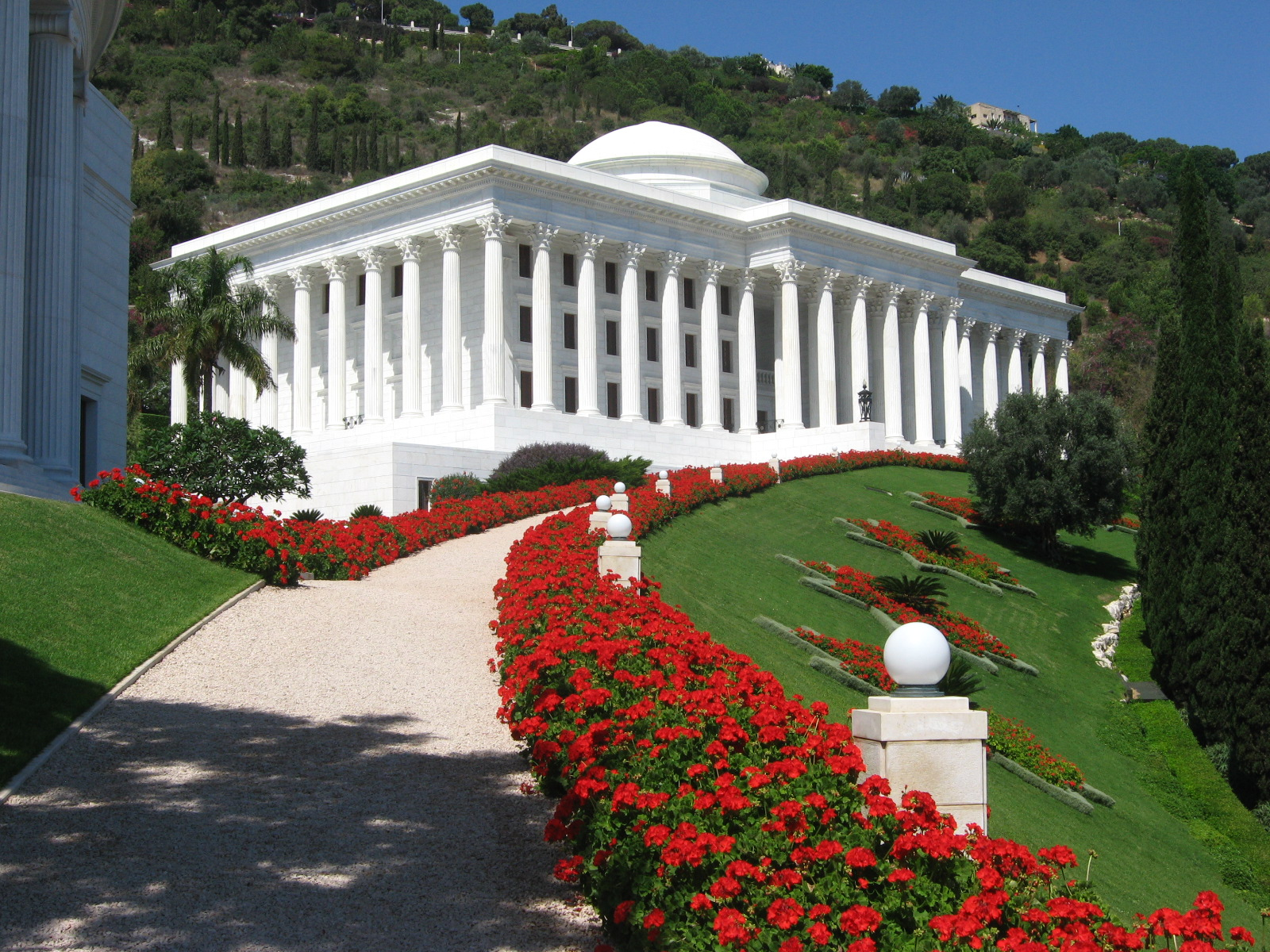
- Seat of the Universal House of Justice
- Predecessor: International Baháʼí Council
- Formation: 1963; 63 years ago
- Type: Baháʼí administration
- Headquarters: Baháʼí World Centre
- Location: Haifa, Israel
- Coordinates: 32.811667°N 34.9875°E

The Universal House of Justice is the international governing body of the Baháʼí Faith. It was envisioned by Baháʼu'lláh, the founder of the Baháʼí Faith, as an institution that could legislate on issues not already addressed in the Baháʼí writings, providing flexibility for the Baháʼí Faith to adapt to changing conditions. It was first elected in 1963, and subsequently every five years, by delegates consisting of the members of Baháʼí National Spiritual Assemblies throughout the world.

The Universal House of Justice, as the head of the religion, has provided direction to the worldwide Baháʼí community primarily through a series of multi-year plans, as well as through annual messages delivered during the Ridván festival. The messages have focused on increasing the number of Local Spiritual Assemblies, translating Baháʼí literature, establishing Baháʼí Centres, completing Baháʼí Houses of Worship, holding international conferences, and developing educational systems to enhance literacy, the role of women, spirituality for children and youth, family life, social and economic development, and communal worship. The Universal House of Justice has also played a role in responding to systemic persecution of Baháʼís in Iran by garnering worldwide media attention.

The books and documents published by the Universal House of Justice are considered authoritative, and its decisions are regarded as infallible by Baháʼís. Although it is empowered to legislate on matters that are not addressed in the Baha'i holy writings, the Universal House of Justice has rarely exercised this function.

The Seat of the Universal House of Justice and its members reside in Haifa, Israel, on the slope of Mount Carmel. The most recent election was 29 April 2023. Although all other elected and appointed roles in the Baháʼí Faith are open to men and women, membership on the Universal House of Justice is male-only; the Baháʼí writings indicate that the reason for this will become clear in the future.

== History ==
Baháʼu'lláh, the founder of the Baháʼí Faith, in his book the Kitáb-i-Aqdas first ordains the institution of the House of Justice and defines its functions. The institution's responsibilities are also expanded on and referred to in several other of Baháʼu'lláh's writings including in his Tablets of Baháʼu'lláh. In those writings Baháʼu'lláh writes that the Universal House of Justice would assume authority over the religion and would consider matters that had not been covered by himself; he stated that the members of the institution would be assured of divine inspiration, and have the regard for all peoples and safe-guard their honour.

Later, ʻAbdu'l-Bahá, Baháʼu'lláh's son and successor, in his Will and Testament, elaborated on its functioning, its composition and outlined the method for its election. He wrote that the Universal House of Justice would be under Baháʼu'lláh's protection, that it would be freed of error, and that obedience to it would be obligatory. ʻAbdu'l-Bahá first used the term "Universal House of Justice" to distinguish the supreme body from those local 'Houses of Justice' to be established in each community, and the secondary 'Houses of Justice,' which are the current Baháʼí National Spiritual Assemblies. He also stated that the institution's decisions could be by majority vote, but that unanimous decisions were preferred, and that it would be elected by the members of the secondary Houses of Justice. He also confirmed Baháʼu'lláh's statements that although women and men are spiritually equal, membership on the Universal House of Justice would be confined to men, and that the wisdom behind this decision would become apparent in the future (see Baháʼí Faith and gender equality).

While both ʻAbdu'l-Bahá and Shoghi Effendi, heads of the religion after Baháʼu'lláh, considered establishing the Universal House of Justice, they both declined to do so. Shoghi Effendi's reason was due to his belief in the weakness of the existing Baháʼí institutions — there were a very limited number of national spiritual assemblies and local spiritual assemblies. Thus during his lifetime, Shoghi Effendi prepared for the election of the Universal House of Justice, by establishing a strong administrative structure at the local and national levels. In 1951 when there were 9 National Spiritual Assemblies, Shoghi Effendi appointed members to the International Baháʼí Council, and described it as an embryonic international House of Justice. After Shoghi Effendi's unexpected death in 1957, the Hands of the Cause directed the affairs of the religion and announced that the election of the Universal House of Justice would occur in 1963 at the end of the Ten Year Crusade, an international teaching plan instituted by Shoghi Effendi.

In 1961 the International Baháʼí Council was changed to an elected body, with members of all National Spiritual Assemblies voting for its members. Then in April 1963, the first Universal House of Justice was elected, six years after the passing of Shoghi Effendi, by 56 National Spiritual Assemblies. The date of the election coincided with the completion of the Ten Year Crusade and also with the first centenary anniversary of the public declaration of Baháʼu'lláh in the Garden of Ridván in April 1863. Since then the Universal House of Justice has acted as the head of the religion – individual members have no authority, only as an assembly do they have authority. In 1972 it published its constitution.

== Election process ==
The Universal House of Justice is elected through secret ballot and plurality vote in a three-stage election by adult Baháʼís throughout the world. The House of Justice is elected without nominations or campaigning and all adult male members of the Baháʼí Faith are eligible for election to the House. The body is elected every five years during a convention of the members of the various National Spiritual Assemblies (NSAs) across the world. Each member of the various NSAs, who were themselves elected by the Baháʼís of their country, votes for nine adult male Baháʼís.

In Haifa on 29 April 2013, more than 1,000 Bahá'ís from 157 countries elected the Universal House of Justice, fifty years after the first election in 1963, according to the Bahá'í World News Service (BWNS), the official news service of the Bahá'í community.

At the thirteenth International Convention in 2023, 1,300 representatives from 176 countries took part in the most recent election of the members of the Universal House of Justice.

== Responsibilities ==
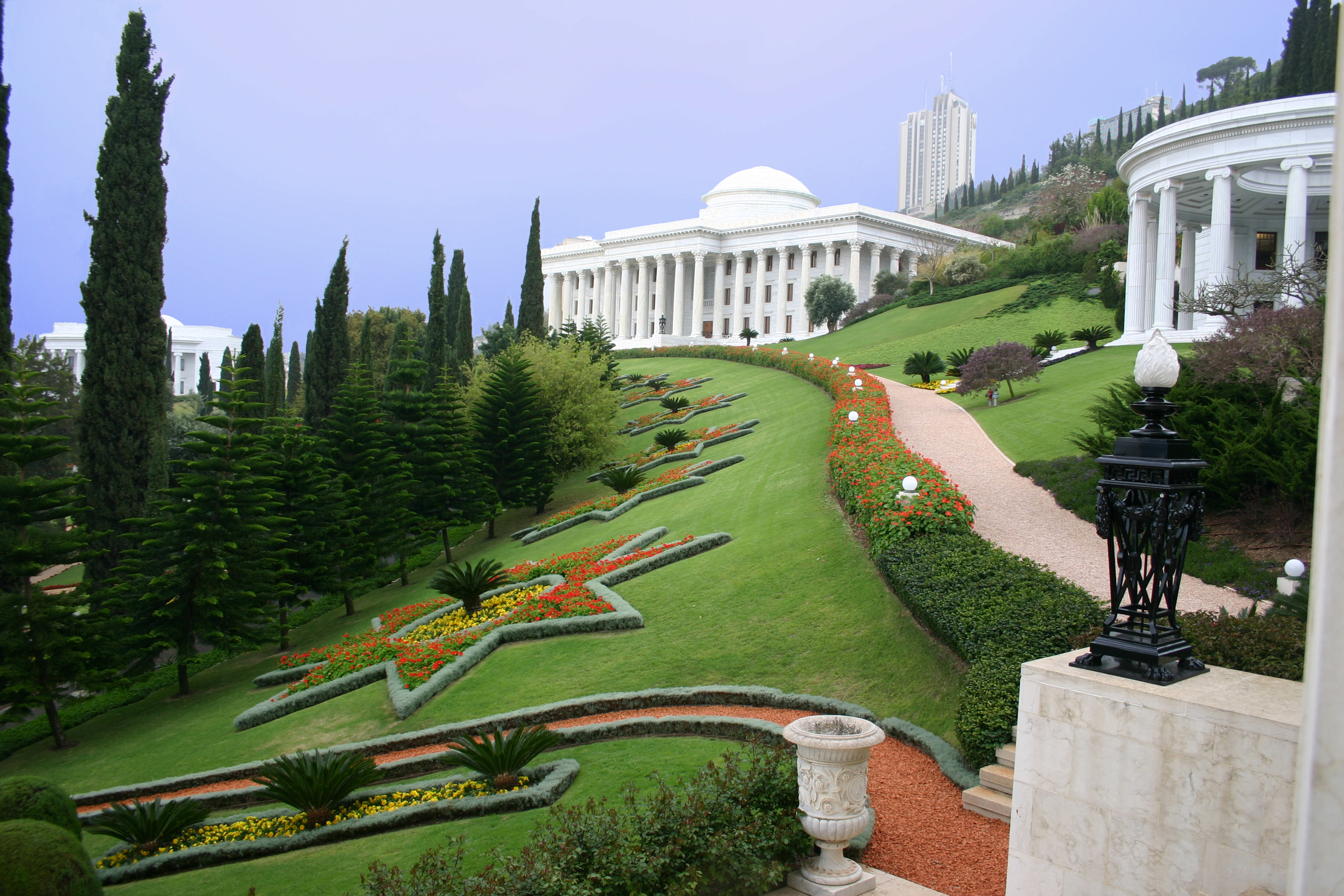
Seat of the Universal House of Justice

The Universal House of Justice today guides the growth and development of the global Baháʼí community. The general functions of the Universal House of Justice, as stated by Baháʼu'lláh, include to promulgate the cause of God, to preserve the law, to administer social affairs, to educate the people's souls, to guarantee the education of children, to make the entire world prosperous (eliminate extremes of wealth and poverty), and to care for the elderly and the ill who are in poverty. According to the constitution of the Universal House of Justice, some of its powers and duties include:

- Promoting the spiritual qualities that characterize Baháʼí life individually and collectively
- Preserving, translating and publishing Baháʼí sacred texts
- Defending and protecting the global Baháʼí community from repression and persecution
- Preserving and developing the world spiritual and administrative centre of the Baháʼí Faith
- Encouraging the growth and maturation of the Baháʼí community and administration
- Safeguarding individual personal rights, freedoms and initiatives
- Applying Baháʼí principles and laws
- Developing, abrogating and changing laws that are not recorded in the Baháʼí sacred texts, according to the requirements of the time
- Pronouncing sanctions against violations of Baháʼí law
- Adjudicating and arbitrating of disputes referred to it
- Administrating all religious funds and endowments such as Huqúqu'lláh that are entrusted to its care

Furthermore, the Universal House of Justice is instructed by Baháʼu'lláh to exert a positive influence on the general welfare of humankind, to promote a permanent peace among the nations of the world, ensure the "training of peoples, the up building of nations, the protection of man and the safeguarding of his honour".

=== Jurisdiction ===
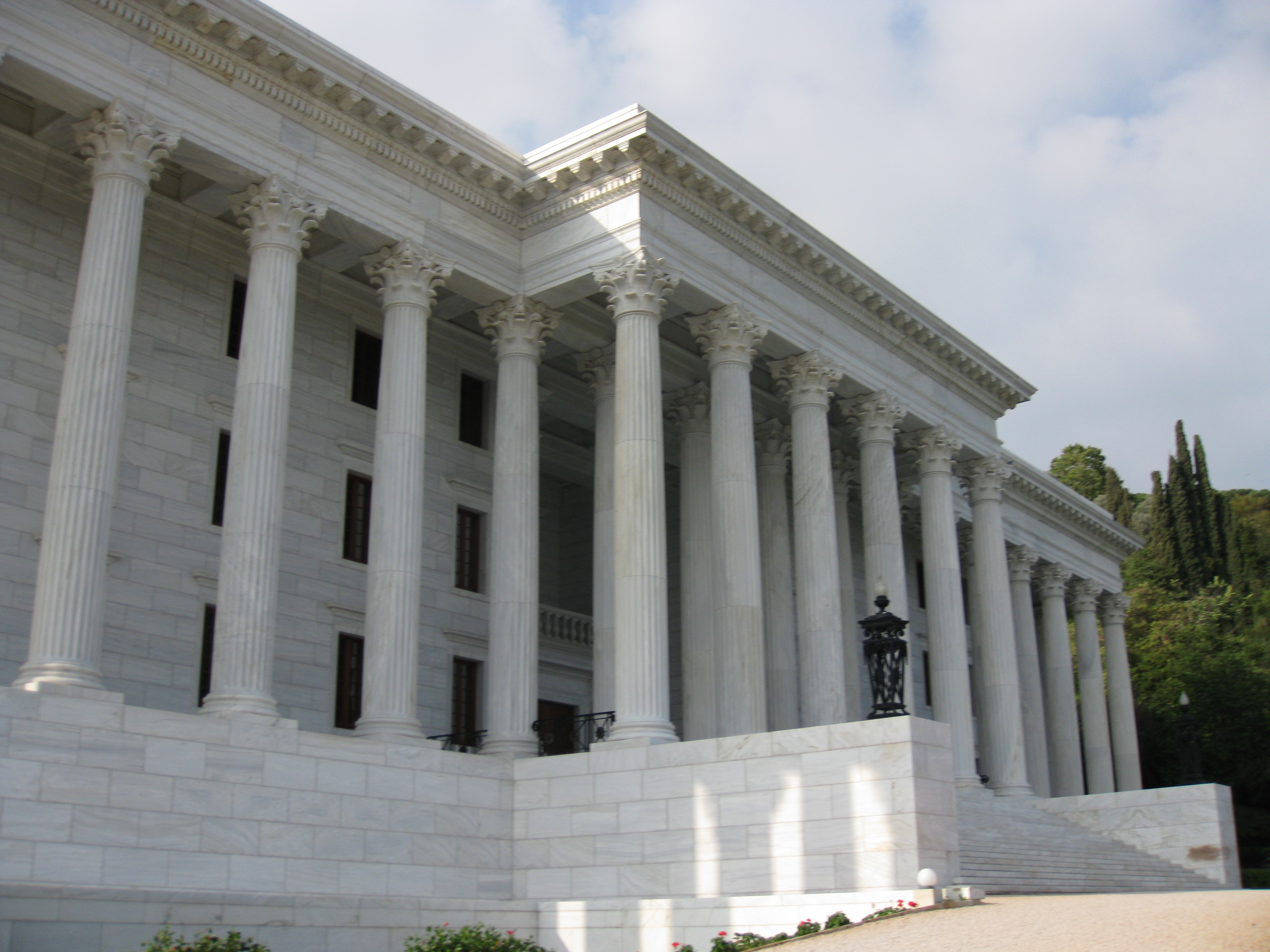
Seat of the Universal House of Justice

The Universal House of Justice is also given the responsibility of adapting the Baháʼí Faith as society progresses, and is thus given the power to legislate on matters not explicitly covered in the Baháʼí sacred texts. While the Universal House of Justice is authorized to change or repeal its own legislation as conditions change, it cannot dissolve or change any of the laws which are explicitly written in the sacred texts.

== Publications ==
While being empowered to legislate on matters, the Universal House of Justice has, since its inception in 1963, limited its exercise of this function. Instead, it has provided general guidance to Baháʼís around the world, and not specific laws; this guidance has generally been through the form of letters and messages, much like Shoghi Effendi's communications. Many of these letters have been published in compilations and are regarded as divinely empowered and authoritative; its decisions are considered infallible to Baháʼís. The letters cover a range of subjects including teaching, prayer, family life, education and Baháʼí administration. Each year on the first day of Ridván (which may be on April 20 or 21 depending on the dating of Naw-Rúz), the Universal House of Justice addresses a message to the worldwide Baháʼí community, known as Ridván messages.

The institution has also collected and published extracts from the writings of the Báb, Baháʼu'lláh and ʻAbdu'l-Bahá. In 1992 they published the Kitáb-i-Aqdas, Baháʼu'lláh's book of laws in English, and further translations have since been published. During these endeavours, they established departments of research and archives at the Baháʼí World Centre, and, as of 1983, have collected over 60,000 letters of Baháʼu'lláh, ʻAbdu'l-Bahá and Shoghi Effendi. These collected works have been used as a base in the deliberations of the Universal House of Justice.

- The Promise of World Peace (1985)

Statement addressed "To the Peoples of the World", presented to over 160 heads of state and government. It outlines the major prerequisites for, as well as the obstacles working against, the establishment of world peace.

- Baháʼu'lláh (1992)

Marking the centenary of the passing of Baháʼu'lláh, this statement is a review of his life and work.

- The Prosperity of Humankind (1995)

A statement on the concept of global prosperity in the context of the Baháʼí Teachings.

- Century of Light (2001)

Review of the 20th century, focusing on dramatic changes and the emergence of the Baha'i Faith from obscurity.

- Letter to the World's Religious Leaders (2002)

Letter addressing the disease of sectarian hatreds. Calling on all religious movements to "rise above fixed conceptions inherited from a distant past."

- One Common Faith (2005)

Document primarily intended for a Baháʼí audience, in which it identifies as a major challenge for the Baháʼí community the inculcation of the principle of the oneness of religion and the overcoming of religious prejudices.

== Current members ==
The current members of the Universal House of Justice are:

- Paul Lample (2005)
- Payman Mohajer (2005)
- Shahriar Razavi (2008)
- Ayman Rouhani (2013)
- Chuungu Malitonga (2013)
- Juan Francisco Mora (2018)
- Praveen Mallik (2018)
- Albert Nshisu Nsunga (2023)
- Andrej Donoval (2023)

== Past members ==
The initial election in 1963 drew five members from the International Baháʼí Council, two from the National Spiritual Assembly (NSA) of the United States, one from the NSA of Britain, and one from the NSA of India.

Members are entered in the table under the year when they were first elected. Starting with the first election in 1963, regular elections of the entire membership have occurred every five years, and there have been five by-elections, noted in the table with italics, in 1982, 1987, 2000, 2005 and 2010. All members have continued to serve after re-election in subsequent conventions. Amoz Gibson, Charles Wolcott, and Adib Taherzadeh died while in office while the other former members were allowed to retire.

1963	1968	1973	1978	1982	1983	1987	1988	1993	1998	2000	2003	2005	2008	2010	2013	2018	2023
Lutfu'lláh Hakím	David Ruhe							Farzam Arbab*							Ayman Rouhani		
Amoz Gibson				Glenford Mitchell									Gustavo Correa			Praveen Mallik	
Charles Wolcott						Peter Khan								Stephen Hall			Andrej Donoval
David Hofman							Hooper Dunbar							Stephen Birkland			Albert Nshisu Nsunga
Borrah Kavelin							Adib Taherzadeh			Kiser Barnes					Chuungu Malitonga		
Hugh Chance								J. Douglas Martin				Paul Lample					
Alí Nakhjavání											Hartmut Grossmann		Shahriar Razavi				
Hushmand Fatheazam											Firaydoun Javaheri					Juan Francisco Mora	
Ian Semple												Payman Mohajer					

- Farzam Arbab (October 27, 1941 – September 25, 2020), born in Tehran, Iran was a member from 1993 until he relinquished his membership in 2013, at the age of 71.

== See also ==
- Baháʼí administration
