= Udo Schaefer =

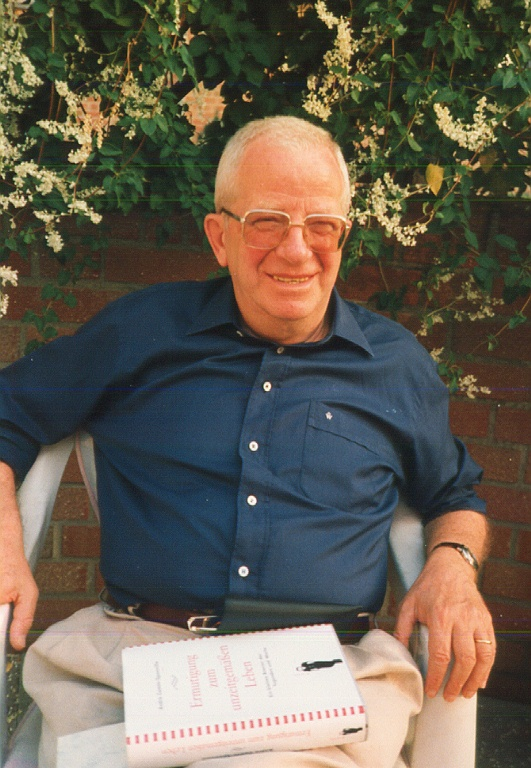
Schaefer in 2007

Udo Schaefer (October 19, 1926 – August 30, 2019) was a German lawyer and a theologian of the Baháʼí Faith.

== Education ==
Schafer received a Doctor of Law degree in church law from Rupert Carola University. His doctoral thesis was on "the legal basis of the Bahá'í Administrative Order in comparison with Canon Law and Protestant Church Law".

== Career ==
Schaefer served as a judge, and later head prosecutor at the State Court of Heidelberg. He was also a member of the National Spiritual Assembly of the Baha'is of Germany.

== Publications ==
- Schaefer, U. (2007). Baháʼí Ethics in Light of Scripture, Volume 1 - Doctrinal Fundamentals. Oxford, UK: George Ronald. ISBN 978-0-85398-505-1.
- Schaefer, U. (2009). Baháʼí Ethics in Light of Scripture, Volume 2 - Virtues and Divine Commandments. Oxford, UK: George Ronald. ISBN 978-0-85398-518-1.
- Schaefer, U. (1998). Beyond the Clash of Religions: The Emergence of a New Paradigm (2nd ed.). Stockholm, Sweden: Zero Palm Press.
- Schaefer, U. (1986). The Imperishable Dominion. Oxford, UK: George Ronald. ISBN 0-85398-142-6.
- Schaefer, U. (2004). In a Blue Haze: Smoking and Baha'i Ethics. Hofheim, Germany: Baha'i-Verlag. ISBN 978-3-87037-411-2.
- Schaefer, U. (1977). The Light Shineth in Darkness: Five Studies in Revelation After Christ. Oxford, UK: George Ronald. ISBN 978-0-85398-091-9.
- Schaefer, U.; Towfigh, N.; Gollmer, U. (2000). Making the Crooked Straight: A Contribution to Baháʼí Apologetics. Oxford, UK: George Ronald. ISBN 0-85398-443-3.
