= Ridván =

Twelve-day festival in the Baháʼí Faith

Riḍván (Arabic: رضوان, romanized: Riḍwān, lit. 'Paradise'; Bahá'í orthography: Rezván, Persian pronunciation: [ɾezvɒːn]) is a twelve-day festival in the Bahá'í Faith commemorating Bahá'u'lláh's declaration that he was a Manifestation of God. In the Bahá'í calendar, it begins at sunset on the 13th of Jalál, which translates to the 20th or 21 April, depending on the date of the March equinox (exactly one month on the Gregorian calendar after the equinox). In 2026, it begins in the evening of 21 April. On the first, ninth and twelfth days of Ridván, work and school should be suspended.

Riḍwān is named for the Garden of Ridván, Baghdad, where Bahá'u'lláh stayed for twelve days after the Ottoman Empire exiled him from the city before he journeyed to Constantinople.

It is the holiest Bahá'í festival, and is also referred to as the "Most Great Festival" and the "King of Festivals".

== History ==
=== Context ===
In 1844 Ali-Muhammad of Shiraz proclaimed that he was the Báb (Arabic for 'Gate'), after a Twelver Shi'i religious concept. His followers were therefore known as Bábís. The Báb's writings introduced the concept of "He whom God shall make manifest", a Messianic figure whose coming, according to Bahá'ís, was announced in the scriptures of all of the world's great religions.

Bahá'u'lláh claimed that his mission as the Promised One of the Báb, was revealed to him in 1852 while imprisoned in the prison known as the Black Pit of Qajar Iran. After his release from the Black Pit, Bahá'u'lláh was banished from Qajar territory and he settled in Baghdad, which became the centre of Bábí activity. Although he did not openly declare this prophetic mandate, he increasingly became the leader of the Bábí community.

Bahá'u'lláh's rising prominence in the city, and the revival of the Persian Bábí community, gained the attention of his enemies in the ulema and the Qajar government. They were eventually successful in having the Ottoman government summon Bahá'u'lláh from Baghdad to Istanbul.

=== Najibiyyih garden ===
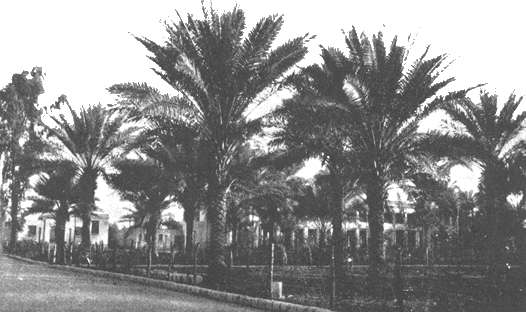
Garden of Ridván, Baghdad

Before Bahá'u'lláh left for Constantinople, many visitors came to visit him. To allow his family to prepare for the trip, and to be able to receive all these visitors, he decided to move to the Garden of Ridwan across the Tigris from Baghdad. He entered the garden on 22 April 1863 (31 days after Nawrúz, which usually occurs on 21 March) accompanied by his sons ʻAbdu'l-Bahá, Mírzá Mihdí and Mírzá Muhammad ʻAlí, his secretary Mirza Aqa Jan, and some others, and stayed there for eleven days.

After he arrived in the garden, Bahá'u'lláh announced his mission and station for the first time to a small group of family and friends. The exact nature and details of Bahá'u'lláh's declaration are unknown. Bahíyyih Khánum is reported to have said that Bahá'u'lláh stated his claim to his son ʻAbdu'l-Bahá and four others. While some Bábís had come to the realization that Bahá'u'lláh was claiming to be the Promised One through the many remarks and allusions that he had made during his final few months in Baghdad, it appears that most other Bábís were unaware of Bahá'u'lláh's claim until a few years later while he was in Edirne.

For the next eleven days Bahá'u'lláh received visitors including the governor of Baghdad. Bahá'u'lláh's family was not able to join him until 30 April, the ninth day, since the river had risen and made travel to the garden difficult though lasting only nine days was a comparatively mild flooding of the river. On the twelfth day of their stay in the garden, Bahá'u'lláh and his family left the garden and started on their journey to Constantinople.

== Festival ==
In the Kitáb-i-Aqdas, written during 1873, Bahá'u'lláh ordains Ridván as one of two "Most Great Festivals", along with the Declaration of the Báb. He then specified the first, ninth, and twelfth days to be holy days; these days mark the days of Bahá'u'lláh's arrival, the arrival of his family and their departure from the Ridván garden, respectively.

The Festival of Ridván is observed according to the Bahá'í calendar, and begins on the thirty-second day of the Bahá'í year, which falls on 20 or 21 April. The festival properly starts at two hours before sunset on that day, which symbolises the time that Bahá'u'lláh entered the garden. On the first, ninth, and twelfth days, which are Bahá'í Holy Days, work is prohibited. Currently, the three holy days are usually observed with a community gathering where prayers are shared, followed by a celebration.

== Significance ==
The time that Bahá'u'lláh spent at the Garden of Ridván in April 1863, and the associated festival and celebration, has a very large significance for Bahá'ís. Bahá'u'lláh calls it one of two "Most Great Festivals" and describes the first day as "the Day of supreme felicity" and he then describes the Garden of Ridvan as "the Spot from which He shed upon the whole of creation the splendours of his Name, the All-Merciful".

The festival is significant because of Bahá'u'lláh's private declaration to a few followers that he was "He Whom God shall make manifest" and a Manifestation of God, and thus it forms the beginning point of the Bahá'í faith as distinct from Bábism. It is also significant because Bahá'u'lláh left his house in Baghdad, which he designated the "Most Great House", to enter the Garden of Ridván. Bahá'u'lláh compares this move from the Most Great House to the Garden of Ridwan to Muhammad's Hijrah.

Furthermore, during Bahá'u'lláh's first day in the garden, he made three further announcements: (1) abrogating religious war, which was permitted under certain conditions in Islam and the Bábí faith; (2) that there would not be another Manifestation of God for another 1000 years; and (3) that all the names of God were fully manifest in all things. These statements appear in a text written some years after 1863, which has been included in the compilation Days of Remembrance (section 9). Nader Saiedi states that these three principles are "affirmed, expounded, and institutionalized" in Bahá'u'lláh's Kitab-i-Aqdas, which was completed in 1873.

== Related texts ==
Throughout his life, Bahá'u'lláh wrote several tablets and prayers on the occasion of Ridván, among which are the following.

- Lawh-i Húr-i ʻUjáb (Tablet of the Maid of Heaven)
- Lawh-i ʻÁshiq vaMaʻshúq (Tablet of the Lover and the Beloved)
- Súrih-i Qalam (Súrih of the Pen)

These and several others are published in the volume titled Days of Remembrance.

== Bahá'í elections ==
The Ridván period is also the time when Bahá'í elections for the local and national Spiritual Assemblies take place every year, as well as the election of the Universal House of Justice, every five years.

== Ridván messages ==
Annually, during Ridván, the Universal House of Justice sends a 'Ridván message' to the worldwide Bahá'í community, which generally looks back on the previous year, and provides further guidance for the coming year. (Note: All Ridván messages can be found at Bahai.org and Bahaiprayers.net/Ridvan (multi-lingual).)

Holy Days of the Baháʼí calendar
| Year | Naw-Rúz | 1st day of Ridván | 9th day of Ridván | 12th day of Ridván | Declaration of the Báb | Ascension of Bahá'u'lláh | Martyrdom of the Báb | Birth of the Báb | Birth of Bahá'u'lláh | Day of the Covenant | Ascension of ʻAbdu'l-Bahá |
|---|---|---|---|---|---|---|---|---|---|---|---|
| 2024 | 20 Mar | 20 Apr | 28 Apr | 1 May | 23 May | 28 May | 9 Jul | 2 Nov | 3 Nov | 25 Nov | 27 Nov |
| 2025 | 20 Mar | 20 Apr | 28 Apr | 1 May | 23 May | 28 May | 9 Jul | 22 Oct | 23 Oct | 25 Nov | 27 Nov |
| 2026 | 21 Mar | 21 Apr | 29 Apr | 2 May | 24 May | 29 May | 10 Jul | 10 Nov | 11 Nov | 26 Nov | 28 Nov |
| 2027 | 21 Mar | 21 Apr | 29 Apr | 2 May | 24 May | 29 May | 10 Jul | 30 Oct | 31 Oct | 26 Nov | 28 Nov |
| 2028 | 20 Mar | 20 Apr | 28 Apr | 1 May | 23 May | 28 May | 9 Jul | 19 Oct | 20 Oct | 25 Nov | 27 Nov |
| 2029 | 20 Mar | 20 Apr | 28 Apr | 1 May | 23 May | 28 May | 9 Jul | 7 Nov | 8 Nov | 25 Nov | 27 Nov |
| 2030 | 20 Mar | 20 Apr | 28 Apr | 1 May | 23 May | 28 May | 9 Jul | 28 Oct | 29 Oct | 25 Nov | 27 Nov |
| 2031 | 21 Mar | 21 Apr | 29 Apr | 2 May | 24 May | 29 May | 10 Jul | 17 Oct | 18 Oct | 26 Nov | 28 Nov |

== See also ==
- Garden of Ridván, Akka
