= Adib Taherzadeh =

Prominent Iranian Baháʼí

Adib Taherzadeh (29 April 1921 in Yazd, Iran – 26 January 2000) was a Baháʼí author who also served as a member of the Universal House of Justice, the supreme governing body of the Baháʼís, between 1988 and 2000.

== Biography ==
Taherzadeh was born into an Iranian family that had a strong association with the Baháʼí Faith since its inception, in Yazd, Iran.

Taherzadeh served on the National Spiritual Assembly of the Baháʼís of the British Isles from 1960 to 1971. He was elected to the National Spiritual Assembly of the Baháʼís of the Republic of Ireland when it was formed in 1972 and was appointed in 1976 to the European Continental Board of Counsellors, a senior advisory body. He was elected to the Universal House of Justice in 1988.

Taherzadeh wrote several books on the Baháʼí history and teachings, which included a four volume study of the life and writings of Baháʼu'lláh, the founder of the Baháʼí Faith.

== Works ==
- Taherzadeh, Adib (2000). The Child of the Covenant. Oxford, UK: George Ronald. ISBN 0-85398-439-5.
- Taherzadeh, Adib (1992). The Covenant of Baháʼu'lláh. Oxford, UK: George Ronald. ISBN 0-85398-344-5.
- Taherzadeh, Adib (1974). The Revelation of Baháʼu'lláh, Volume 1: Baghdad 1853-63. Oxford, UK: George Ronald. ISBN 0-85398-052-7.
- Taherzadeh, Adib (1977). The Revelation of Baháʼu'lláh, Volume 2: Adrianople 1863-68. Oxford, UK: George Ronald. ISBN 0-85398-071-3.
- Taherzadeh, Adib (1983). The Revelation of Baháʼu'lláh, Volume 3: ʻAkka, The Early Years 1868-77. Oxford, UK: George Ronald. ISBN 0-85398-143-4.
- Taherzadeh, Adib (1987). The Revelation of Baháʼu'lláh, Volume 4: Mazra'ih & Bahji 1877-92. Oxford, UK: George Ronald. ISBN 0-85398-270-8.
- Taherzadeh, Adib (1972). Trustees of the Merciful. London, UK: Baháʼí Publishing Trust. ISBN 0-900125-09-8.
- Taherzadeh, A.; Spiritual Assembly of the Baháʼís of Ireland (1982). Spiritualization of the Baháʼí Community - A Plan for Teaching.
- Barnes, Kiser (ed.) (2003). Stories of Baha'u'llah and Some Notable Believers. Extracts compiled from Adib Taherzadeh's The Revelation of Bahá’u’lláh, Volumes 1–4.
