= Prayer in the Baháʼí Faith =

Prayer and meditation are at the heart of the devotional life of a Baháʼí, and the Baháʼí concept of worship is inextricably bound to that of service to God and to humanity. Works done in the spirit of service are themselves accounted as a form of prayer, and Baháʼís are enjoined to live in a state of prayer, turning their hearts towards God throughout the day as well as reciting prayers during times of devotion. Among other things, prayer is seen as a spiritual conversation between a human soul and its Maker, a fire that burns away the veils separating a soul from God, and spiritual food for the soul.

There are two types of verbal prayer in the Baháʼí Faith: obligatory prayer and general or devotional prayer. Both types of prayer are composed of reverent words which are addressed to God, and the act of prayer is one of the most important Baháʼí laws for individual discipline. The purpose of prayer in the Baháʼí Faith is to grow closer to God and His Manifestations, to improve one's conduct, and to request divine assistance.

Baháʼís between the ages of 15 and 70 are required to perform one of three prescribed obligatory prayers daily and individually, according to a set form and in accordance with specific laws. In addition to the daily obligatory prayer, Baháʼí scripture directs believers daily to offer devotional prayer as well as to meditate and study sacred scripture. There is no set form for devotions and meditation.

There is a large corpus of devotional prayers written by the Báb, Baháʼu'lláh, and ʻAbdu'l-Bahá, the central figures of the Baháʼí Faith, which are used extensively by Baháʼís in their devotional life. These prayers encompass many topics, including meetings, times of day, healing, spiritual growth, detachment, protection, forgiveness, assistance, and unity. They are held in high esteem. Group reading from prayer books and mobile applications is a common feature of Baháʼí gatherings. Baháʼís commonly gather informally in each other's homes to read prayers in events known as devotionals. Participants in a devotional gathering take turns reading aloud from a prayer book while the others listen in reverent silence.

== General teachings ==
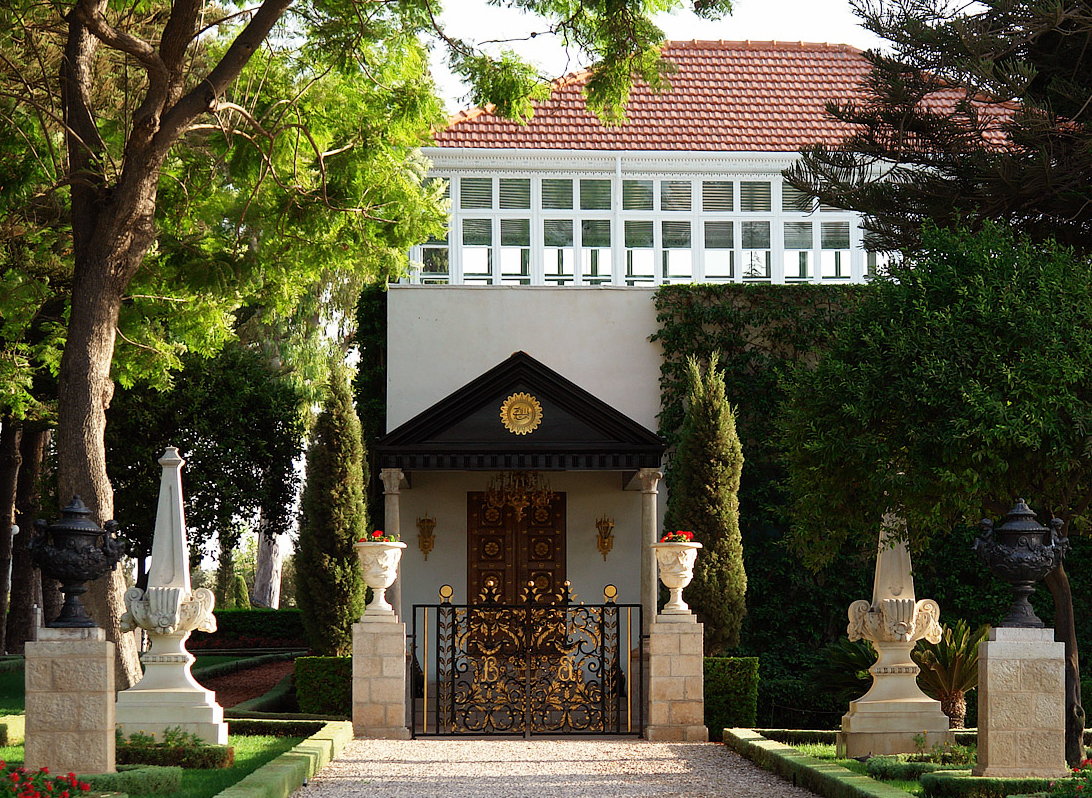
The Shrine of Baháʼu'lláh at Bahjí, Israel

Baháʼu'lláh, the founder of the Baháʼí Faith, encouraged Baháʼís to pray frequently. He wrote that prayer should be used both individually as an act of worship in turning to God and collectively in meetings. The Baháʼí writings state that prayer is essential to the development of spirituality, and that it is natural to have the impulse to pray. The benefit of prayer, however, is not obtained by the act of praying itself, but by the spiritual state induced by prayer. In that regard, Baháʼu'lláh wrote that a brief prayer that is joyful is better than a long prayer which does not induce a spiritual state; it is the spirit in which the prayer is offered that is important.

For prayer, meditation and study to have value is seen as contingent on them being linked to action, particularly when the action benefits humanity. Conversely, action should be reinforced by these practices, which strengthen the soul and nourish the mind. The relation of prayer and action taken in the spirit of service is so close that they are described in equivalent terms. For example, ʻAbdu'l-Bahá advised believers to "strive that your actions day by day may be beautiful prayers".

In the Baháʼí writings, the purpose of prayer is to get closer to God, to improve one's conduct, and to request divine assistance. Prayer is also used to express an individual's love of God and to affect their inner self. Prayer can also be used to obtain specific material ends, but the Baháʼí writings state that it is more important to pray for the love of God without any other hope or fear. Baháʼu'lláh wrote that prayer is essential to any undertaking and that it attracts confirmations from God.

The Baháʼí teachings state that individual prayers are best said when one is alone and free of distractions, such as early in the morning or late at night. Collective prayers, which usually are performed by individuals taking turns in reading prayers, are also encouraged. Collective prayers are usually performed at the beginning of meetings such as Nineteen Day Feasts and Baháʼí administrative meetings. Shoghi Effendi, the head of the Baháʼí Faith in the first half of the 20th century, wrote that prayers may be addressed to God, Baháʼu'lláh, or other Manifestations of God; he recommended, however, that the prayers be either directly or indirectly addressed to Baháʼu'lláh.

The interrelation of prayer and service to humanity is also found in Baháʼí Houses of Worship. In addition to being spaces in which Baháʼís and non-Baháʼís can express their devotion to God, they are associated with humanitarian, social, educational, and scientific services intended to benefit humanity. ʻAbdu'l-Bahá stated that facilities including a hospital, medical centre, dispensary, travellers' hostel, school for orphans and the poor, a home for people with disabilities, and a university should be situated around the House of Worship.

== Obligatory Baháʼí prayers ==
In addition to general prayers, Baháʼu'lláh prescribed a daily obligatory prayer in his book of laws, the Kitáb-i-Aqdas. The obligatory prayer is a primary religious obligation starting at the age of fifteen and is the most important kind of prayer. The purpose of the obligatory prayer is to foster the development of humility and devotion. Unlike almost all other prayers in the Baháʼí Faith, there are specific regulations concerning the obligatory prayers; however, obligatory prayer is a personal spiritual obligation and thus no Baháʼí administrative sanction can be obtained if a Baháʼí fails to say his prayer daily.

Baháʼu'lláh wrote three obligatory prayers—the short, the medium, and the long—and Baháʼís are free to choose to say any one of the three each day. The short and medium prayers have to be said at specific times. The short prayer has to be said once between noon and sunset, and the medium prayer three times daily: once between sunrise and noon, once between noon and sunset, and once between sunset and two hours after sunset. The long prayer can be said at any time during the day. The medium and long prayers also include movements and gestures during the prayers, which are obligatory except when a person is physically incapable of performing them. Shoghi Effendi wrote that the motions and gestures are symbolic and are used to help concentration during the prayers. Furthermore, obligatory prayer is to be preceded by ablutions—the cleaning of the hands and face.

During obligatory prayers Baháʼís face the Qiblih, which is the Shrine of Baháʼu'lláh, comparable in practice to Muslims facing the Kaaba during daily prayer, or Christians and Jews facing Jerusalem. The Báb changed the direction of prayer to "He whom God shall make manifest", a role claimed by Baháʼu'lláh. During Baháʼu'lláh's lifetime, Baháʼís prayed facing him, until the direction became fixed toward the place where he was buried. A Tablet explaining the direction of prayer existed but was reportedly stolen by Covenant-breakers.

== Corpus of general prayers ==
Baháʼu'lláh, the Báb, and ʻAbdu'l-Bahá wrote hundreds of prayers, many of which were originally included in letters to individuals. Most of these prayers were written in Arabic and Persian, while ʻAbdu'l-Bahá wrote a few in Turkish. In 1900 the first English-language prayer book was published under the title Tablets, Communes and Holy Utterances. Since then, a large number of prayers have been translated into many hundreds of languages; by 1983 the short obligatory prayer had been translated into 501 languages.

Prayers have been written for awakening, travelling, healing, spiritual growth, detachment, protection, forgiveness, assistance, unity, and other purposes. The prayers may be said aloud, sung, and/or repeated, and the text of a prayer should not be changed. When saying a general prayer, one does not need to face the Qiblih.

Baháʼí prayers vary considerably in form. A typical prayer starts with the supplication of the attributes of God, followed by a statement of praise and then a request such as guidance or protection. The end of the prayer is usually composed of a list of God's attributes. The prayers often use imagery, including references to Islamic literature and Persian poetry.

== Other special prayers ==
There are prayers that can be said in specific circumstances or on specific occasions, including prayers for the fast and specific Baháʼí holy days. These prayers, while not obligatory, have an importance nearly equal to that of the obligatory prayers. Three other prayers are often regarded by Baháʼís as having particular power: the Báb's short prayer for the removal of difficulties, and the Tablet of Ahmad and the Long Healing Prayer, both by Baháʼu'lláh.

The Tablet of Visitation is a prayer used during visits to the Shrines of Baháʼu'lláh and the Báb, and is also used during Baháʼí holy days associated with them. The tablet is composed of passages taken from several of Baháʼu'lláh's writings. There is also a Tablet of Visitation for ʻAbdu'l-Bahá expressing humility and selflessness.

Baháʼu'lláh also wrote a specific prayer for the dead. It is to be said before interment of a Baháʼí. The prayer is read aloud by a single person while those present stand in silence. It is the only Baháʼí congregational prayer.

== Meditation ==
In the Baháʼí teachings, meditation is a primary tool for spiritual development, involving reflection on the words of God. While prayer and meditation are linked, prayer is understood specifically as turning toward God, while meditation is described as a communion with one's self in which one focuses on the divine.

The purpose of meditation is to strengthen one's understanding of the words of God and to make one's soul more receptive to their potentially transformative power. Prayer and meditation together help bring about and maintain spiritual communion with God.

Baháʼu'lláh did not specify a particular form of meditation, leaving individuals free to choose their own form. He stated that Baháʼís should read a passage from the Baháʼí writings twice a day, once in the morning and once in the evening, and meditate upon it. He also encouraged reflection on one's actions and worth at the end of each day. During the Nineteen Day Fast, Baháʼís meditate and pray to reinvigorate their spiritual forces.

== See also ==
- God in the Baháʼí Faith
