= Charles-François Dupuis =

French historian and politician (1742-1809)

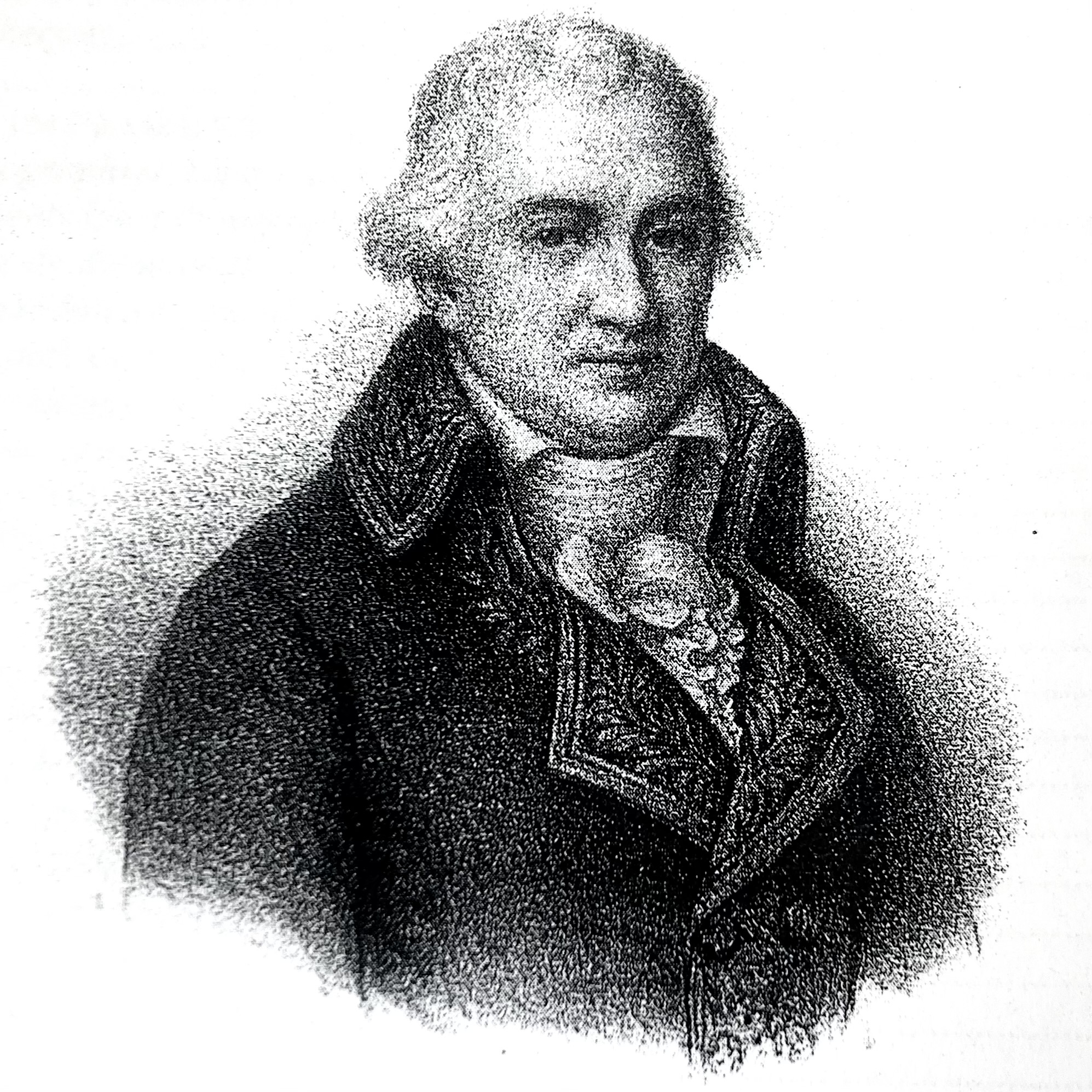
- Born: 26 October 1742; Trie-Château, Kingdom of France
- Died: 29 September 1809 (aged 66); Échevannes, Côte-d'Or, French Empire
- Occupations: Professor of rhetoric, historian of religion, politician

Charles-François Dupuis (26 October 1742 – 29 September 1809) was a French historian of religion and politician.

A professor of Latin rhetoric at the Collège de France, he is best known for his work The Origin of All Religious Worship, published in 1795.

Elected to the National Convention, Dupuis participated in the creation of the French Republican calendar. Under the Directory, he served in the Council of Five Hundred, and later sat in the Corps législatif during the Consulate.

== Under the Ancien Régime ==
=== Early life ===
Charles-François Dupuis was born on 26 October 1742 in Trie-Château, near Gisors, the son of Charles-Antoine Dupuis (1720–1760). His grandfather, Antoine Dupuis (d. 1732), was the village schoolmaster at Parnes, a parish within the Archdiocese of Rouen. His father, who taught at Trie-Château, married Clotilde Chouquet on 29 January 1742. They had three children: Charles-François, Marie-Madeleine (born 1744), and Jean-Antoine (born 1757). In 1753, the family settled in La Roche-Guyon, where his parents opened a boarding school for boys.

As a child, Dupuis developed a passion for surveying and geometry. Around 1755, while practising on the banks of the Seine with a graphometer and attempting to calculate the height of the keep of Château de La Roche-Guyon using the principles of trigonometry, he attracted the attention of the Duke of La Rochefoucauld, lord of La Roche-Guyon. Impressed by the young boy's abilities, the Duke offered to send him to the prestigious Collège d'Harcourt on the rue de la Harpe in Paris.

In the autumn of 1759, after a brief period at the Collège Saint-Lazare in Vernon, Dupuis entered the Collège d'Harcourt at the age of eighteen (three years older than his classmates).

Selected to compete in the Concours général, he won first prize in Latin and second prize in Greek. On 10 August 1760, while travelling home for the holidays, his father drowned in the Seine after falling from the ferry crossing the Seine river between La Roche-Guyon and Moisson.

The Duke of La Rochefoucauld granted Dupuis a second scholarship, enabling him to continue his studies while supporting his family. Thomas-Gilles Asselin, principal of the Collège d'Harcourt, also exempted him from boarding fees.

Between 1760 and 1763, Dupuis received eighteen distinctions in the Concours général: five first prizes, six second prizes, six honourable mentions, and, at the end of his second year of rhetoric, the prestigious prix d'honneur.

He then began the five-year course of study (quinquennium) at the University of Paris, consisting of two years of philosophy followed by three years of theology. At the age of twenty-five, he took the newly established agrégation competitive examination.

=== Professor at the University of Paris ===
Having passed the agrégation in literature in 1767, Dupuis was appointed professor of rhetoric at the Collège de Lisieux in Paris, where he taught for the next twenty years.

He abandoned his theological studies, completed an accelerated course at the Paris Faculty of Law, and, in the summer of 1770, qualified as an avocat en parlement. (Note: Unlike avocats du parlement, avocats en parlement were not professionally required to plead cases before the courts or to belong to the bar.) During this period, he attended the lectures of the astronomer Jérôme Lalande at the Collège Royal.

In 1772, he permanently renounced the ecclesiastical habit – he was previously an acolyte – in order to marry Marie-Marguerite Bourbon (1751–1816). The couple had four children, all of whom died in early childhood.

In 1775, Dupuis delivered the address at the Concours général prize-giving ceremony before the Parlement of Paris, recently re-established by Louis XVI. Among the prizewinners were Maximilien Robespierre and Camille Desmoulins, who later became two prominent figures of the French Revolution.

Six years later, the rector of the University of Paris commissioned him to compose the funeral oration for the Empress Maria Theresa, mother of Queen Marie Antoinette.

=== Pioneer of Optical Telegraphy ===
In the spring of 1778, Dupuis developed an optical telegraph together with the geographer Jean-Baptiste Fortin. Drawing inspiration from the earlier experiments of Guillaume Amontons, they devised a signalling code based on the opening and closing of the shutters of Dupuis's apartment on the heights of Belleville. From Bagneux, Fortin observed the signals through a telescope and decoded the transmitted messages.

They communicated their work to the Secretary of State for War, hoping that it would be passed on to the American revolutionaries supported by France. (Note: Dupuis's patron, the Duke of La Rochefoucauld, was a friend and translator of Benjamin Franklin. In 1783, he published the constitutions of the Thirteen United States of America.) Their proposal, however, came to nothing. Dupuis and Fortin are regarded as precursors of the semaphore telegraph developed by Claude Chappe during the French Revolution.

=== Historian of Religion ===
Beginning in 1777, Dupuis developed the hermeneutic system that would make him famous. He argued that myths were originally allegorical representations of the movements of the celestial sphere and the succession of the seasons, with the deities and heroes of classical antiquity symbolizing heavenly bodies and constellations.

Between 1779 and 1780, he published three letters on the subject in the Journal des savants. His Memoir on the Origin of the Constellations and on the Explanation of Myth through Astronomy was included by Jérôme Lalande in the fourth volume of his Treatise on Astronomy in 1781.

Over the following years, Dupuis published further studies, including one on the yugas – the four ages of the world in Hindu cosmology – in the Mercure de France (14 June 1783), and others on Minerva and Janus.

In a letter dated 3 April 1786, Lalande urged the mathematician Johann III Bernoulli to "take a look" at Dupuis's articles, describing them as "the most curious thing ever accomplished in scholarly astronomy".

Dupuis became embroiled in a controversy with Jean Sylvain Bailly, who criticized his radical allegorical interpretation of mythology, (Note: Bailly wrote: “Another reason keeps me away from those systems that explain so many things. Their generality alarms me; a single superstition becomes a universal explanation. I cannot believe that every secret is enclosed within a single key. I cannot persuade myself that all fables were cast in the same mould and fashioned after the same model.” (Essai sur les fables et leur histoire, 1799, p. 32).) and with the astronomer Guillaume Le Gentil, who accused him of contradicting Biblical chronology. Dupuis maintained that the zodiac, which he believed to be of Egyptian origin, had been devised when the vernal equinox lay in the constellation of Libra, approximately 14 000 BC. This conclusion, derived from the rate of the axial precession, extended far beyond the date traditionally assigned to the Creation. (Note: To avoid censorship and open conflict with religious doctrine, Dupuis adopted Thomas Burnet's hypothesis that the vernal equinox had indeed lain in Libra at the time of the Flood, but that the weight of the waters had caused an accelerated shift in the Earth's axis.) (Note: Le Gentil accepted a pre-Flood origin for Indian astronomy, which he regarded as older than Egyptian astronomy, while remaining within the framework of Biblical chronology. Dupuis argued that the yugas symbolized the Sun's annual cycle. Bailly, for his part, attempted to reconcile these vast chronological periods with Biblical chronology.)

His reputation as an unbeliever hindered his academic ambitions. Dupuis applied several times for election to the Académie des Inscriptions et Belles-Lettres, and despite the support of the Duke of La Rochefoucauld, president of the French Academy of Sciences, he was repeatedly rejected because of the religious suspicions entertained by several members of the academy. (Note: These repeated failures deeply angered Dupuis. As he later wrote in the introduction to The Origin of All Religious Worship, he would have burned the manuscript of his “great work” had his wife not intervened.) He was nevertheless elected to the Royal Academy of Rouen in December 1785.

=== Invitation to Prussia ===
At this time, Frederick the Great was seeking a successor to Dieudonné Thiébault as professor of grammar at the military academy in Berlin. Nicolas de Condorcet recommended Dupuis to the king, (Note: ”…He could not even, by concealing these consequences at the risk of diminishing the merit of his work, avoid displeasing some members of our Academy of Inscriptions, who wished to compel him to profess his beliefs concerning the antiquity of the world.” Condorcet to Frederick II, Paris, 2 May 1785.) and Dupuis was invited to settle in Prussia, where the publication of his works would have been financed.

However, he still lacked two years of service before becoming eligible for emeritus status and receiving a pension from the University of Paris. In the summer of 1786, the Marquis de Miromesnil, Keeper of the Seals of France, granted him a one-year exemption enabling him to qualify for his pension earlier, but the project was abandoned following the death of Frederick the Great.

On 4 September 1787, Baron de Breteuil, Secretary of State of the Maison du Roi, appointed Dupuis professor of Latin rhetoric at the Collège Royal. (Note: He succeeded François Béjot (1718–1787), who had himself succeeded Abbé de La Bléterie. During his first years in the chair, Dupuis devoted his lectures primarily to Cicero and Quintilian.) In December 1788, he was finally elected to the Académie des Inscriptions et Belles-Lettres.

At the beginning of the French Revolution, however, Dupuis resumed his efforts to settle in Berlin, although these plans ultimately came to nothing.

== French Revolution ==
In the spring of 1791, Dupuis was appointed by the Department of Paris, headed by the Duke of La Rochefoucauld, as one of four commissioners for public instruction, alongside Quatremère de Quincy, Lacretelle, and Gallois. Together, they signed the first official report recommending the conversion of the Church of Sainte-Geneviève into a "sepulchral prytaneion" – the future Panthéon.

His responsibilities included purging educational institutions of refractory priests and royalist sympathizers, replacing them with men supportive of the Revolution.

Residing on rue de la Harpe, Dupuis belonged to the same revolutionary section of Paris as Georges Danton, Camille Desmoulins, and Jean-Paul Marat.

In the aftermath of the demonstration of 20 June 1792, the Duke of La Rochefoucauld unsuccessfully ordered the arrest of Jérôme Pétion de Villeneuve, the mayor of the Commune of Paris, and was forced to resign as president of the Department. Following the insurrection of 10 August 1792, a warrant was issued for La Rochefoucauld's arrest. He subsequently became one of the victims of the September Massacres. The death of his patron prompted Dupuis to seek refuge near Évreux, in Louviers, at the home of his friend Antoine Letellier.

=== National Convention ===
On 15 September 1792, Dupuis was elected first substitute deputy for Seine-et-Oise to the National Convention, (Note: He received 359 votes out of 682 cast.) replacing Bertrand Barère, who had chosen to represent the Hautes-Pyrénées. He was appointed commissioner for the issuance of assignats on 26 September, substitute member of the Committee of Decrees on 11 October, and a member of the Committee of Public Instruction (7 November) and the Committee of Finance (13 November).

On 15 January 1793, during the Trial of Louis XVI, the deputies voted by roll call on the guilt of the deposed king, who stood accused of “conspiring against public liberty and attacking the general security of the State.” Dupuis voted to find him guilty. Three days later, when the Convention voted on the sentence, he declared: “I will not cast my vote to deprive the people of an important hostage whom they may one day have the right to demand of you. I therefore vote for detention.”

Following the vote in favour of the death penalty, Dupuis supported the amendment calling for a stay of execution, declaring: “I hope that the decision of the majority will bring happiness to my fellow citizens, and it will do so only if it can withstand the severe judgment of Europe and of posterity, who will judge both the king and his judges.” The motion was defeated, and Louis XVI was guillotined on 21 January.

As a member of the Committee of Public Instruction, Dupuis participated in the work leading to the creation of the French Republican calendar, alongside Lagrange, Monge, Pingré, Lalande, and Guyton de Morveau. On 17 September 1793, the committee's rapporteur, Gilbert Romme, presented the calendar to the National Convention. Inspired by ancient Egypt, it consisted of twelve months of three ten-day weeks, supplemented by five or six "Sansculottides", and began at the september equinox of 1792, the day of the abolition of the monarchy and the beginning of the “French Era”. It came into force on 6 October 1793.

Although Dupuis opposed the arrest of the Girondins and voted on 28 May 1793 to retain the Commission of Twelve, he adopted a deliberately cautious silence during the Reign of Terror. (Note: Nicolas Ruault wrote of Dupuis: “He spoke little in that terrible assembly; he was among the few members who displayed only gentle and humane sentiments. He was a lamb among lions and tigers, able to escape their fury only by maintaining prudent silence. He passed almost unnoticed. Yet he was republican by conviction… He desired the Republic, but not one founded and cemented with the bones and blood of his fellow citizens.”) In November 1793, Pierre-Gaspard Chaumette, prosecutor of the Paris Commune, appointed him curator of historical monuments.

He was unable to prevent the execution of his longtime friend Antoine Letellier, (Note: Dupuis paid tribute to this “friend of thirty-six years” in The Origin of All Religious Worship. The two had first met at the Collège d'Harcourt.) who was condemned to death by the Revolutionary Tribunal on 24 June 1794 for his Girondin sympathies.

After the fall of Robespierre, Dupuis spoke in favour of reinstating the imprisoned deputies of the Convention. In November 1794, “for the honour of the human race”, he called before the Thermidorian Convention for the prosecution of Jean-Baptiste Carrier, the official responsible for the Drownings at Nantes. He argued that Carrier should be prosecuted not as an ordinary criminal but as a counter-revolutionary, so that he could be tried before the Revolutionary Tribunal. (Note: Dupuis hoped to secure an exemplary conviction that would symbolically close the period of the Terror while restoring the legitimacy of the Convention by absolving its members of collective responsibility. Writing about his political position during the White Terror, Céline Pauvros argues that Dupuis belonged to a long-neglected republican current: “He fits none of the usual categories of the 'good revolutionary': too supportive of the Directory (and therefore too 'bourgeois') for some, yet not sufficiently counter-revolutionary for others.” She relates his position to the concept of the extrême centre, developed by the historian Pierre Serna.) Carrier was guillotined on 16 December.

On 7 April 1795, the day the metric system was adopted, Dupuis introduced a motion advocating the gradual withdrawal of the assignats, greater transparency in public finances in order to restore economic confidence, the exclusion of corrupt officials from public administration, the reopening of the stock exchanges, and the implementation of the Constitution of Year I as a guarantee of the Republic's survival and of social stability.

The Committee of Public Instruction subsequently entrusted Dupuis with a two-month mission to oversee the establishment of the new Écoles centrales and primary schools. He travelled through Troyes, Chaumont, Dijon, Besançon, Lons-le-Saunier, Porrentruy, Lyon, Chambéry, Grenoble, Gap, and Toulon before being recalled to Paris in August to vote on the Constitution of Year III.

=== Under the Directory ===
Dupuis was among the forty-eight scholars selected by the Directory to form the initial membership of the National Institute of Sciences and Arts. These forty-eight members subsequently elected ninety-six additional members, bringing the total membership to 144. Dupuis joined the Class of Literature and Fine Arts, in the section devoted to antiquities and monuments.

In November 1795, he delivered a speech before the Council of Five Hundred. Arguing that France should sustain its military effort against the First Coalition, he advocated improved pay for soldiers and better provision for military veterans, while calling for severe penalties against deserters. (Note: "I would also have every citizen liable for the first levy who has failed to join his colours by a fixed date declared infamous, his name posted in his commune, and, after ten years in irons, branded and banished for life. Remember that the Germanic ancestors of the Franks drowned cowards and the infamous beneath a hurdle. If you wish to remain free, brand every man who is not resolved to die for his country; otherwise, your republic exists only on down cushions, and your liberty only in effigy. It is above all your youth to whom you must give great lessons. The death of the son of Gaius Pontius was a great lesson for the youth of Rome, accustomed to the luxury of courts and wishing to restore the rule of kings; your young Chouans are in great need of similar examples. Put in irons those who want masters, and let those who do not want them go and fight the kings.") In March 1796, refusing to allow royalist propaganda to spread throughout the country, he supported Louvet's proposal to restrict freedom of the press.

He also favoured the establishment of a military dictatorship to defend the Republic in times of war, declaring: “Thus the Romans, who in ordinary times had consuls whose authority was strictly limited, were often compelled in troubled times to entrust power to a single man, whose authority was virtually unlimited and not subject to accountability.”

His term ended in the spring of 1797, following the first partial renewal of the legislature, in which the monarchists won a sweeping victory by taking advantage of the property-based electoral system and divisions among the republicans. Dupuis was heavily defeated (Note: His opponent received 205 votes out of 242 cast.) in Seine-et-Oise by the Hellenist Jean-François Vauvilliers, a former colleague at the Collège Royal.

Following the Coup of 18 Fructidor (4 September 1797), he was elected in April 1798 to the Council of Five Hundred by a breakaway electoral assembly meeting at the Queen's Stables in Versailles. The result, however, was annulled by the Law of 22 Floréal Year VI (11 May 1798).

Invited by Monge to join General Napoleon Bonaparte on the Egyptian campaign, Dupuis declined. Instead, as a member of the National Institute, he served on the commission responsible for examining and approving the proceedings of the Institut d'Égypte.

On four occasions, his name was included on the list of candidates for the office of Director submitted by the Council of Five Hundred to the Council of Ancients (on 16 May, and again on 17, 18, and 20 June 1799). Although supported by some republican deputies because of his anti-clerical views, he never received more than two votes in the upper chamber, out of approximately two hundred votes cast.

== Under Napoleon ==
Following the Coup of 18 Brumaire (9 November 1799), Dupuis returned to parliamentary life. On 25 December 1799, he was appointed by the Senate to represent Seine-et-Oise in the Corps législatif.

In January 1800, both the Tribunat and the Corps législatif nominated him for a seat in the Senate, but Napoleon Bonaparte declined to appoint him.

On 22 November 1801, shortly after the signing of the Concordat of 1801 with the Holy See, Dupuis, a prominent anticlerical, was elected president of the Corps législatif. In his inaugural address, however, he adopted a markedly deferential tone towards the First Consul, thanking the “heroic peacemaker […] for having at last safely brought the sacred vessel of the Republic into harbour.”

In his History of the Consulate and the Empire, Adolphe Thiers wrote – without citing his sources:

“M. Dupuis was not as much of an opponent as his book might have suggested, for he had admitted to the First Consul, in conversation with him, that reconciliation with Rome was necessary. Nevertheless, his name carried considerable symbolic weight at a time when the Concordat was one of the principal grievances raised against the Consular government. The intention was easy enough to discern, and it was understood by the public, above all by the First Consul himself, who even exaggerated its significance.”

On 18 January 1803, Bonaparte carried out a political purge by removing the members of the Tribunat who were most hostile to his government. The Corps législatif was likewise affected: deputies considered excessively independent or critical were not reappointed during the annual partial renewals. Dupuis retired from political life at the end of his term of office in April 1803.

=== Final years ===
Within the National Institute, the Class of History and Literature chose the following subject for its Year XI prize competition: “What influence did Luther's Reformation exert upon the political condition of the states of Europe and upon the progress of enlightenment?” Dupuis defended Charles de Villers, whose prize essay praised Luther, against the Catholic jurist Pierre-Joseph de Maleville. The prize was awarded to Villers on 2 April 1804, a decision lamented by the advisers of Pope Pius VII, who mentioned it in a memorandum presented to the Holy Father during his visit to Paris for the coronation of Napoleon.

Dupuis's personal notes reveal his indignation at the conviction of General Moreau and his profound hostility towards the Emperor, whom he described as the "vile usurper whom they call Majesty […] the shame of France and the scourge of Europe.”

In the same notes, he also criticized his friend Lalande, who had met with Pius VII: “Abbé Lalande kissed the Pope's slipper because he would like to obtain a ministry.” The earliest supporter of Dupuis's theories on the history of religion, Lalande had by then distanced himself from him. He had advised Napoleon to abandon the French Republican calendar.

Having been included in Sylvain Maréchal's Dictionary of Ancient and Modern Atheists, Dupuis sought to clarify his religious views. His remarks were published by Lalande in 1805 in the Supplement to the Ancient and Modern Atheists:

“I do not say, as the atheist does, that there is no God; rather, I say that the proofs advanced for His existence are entirely without value. […] In this respect, I think much as Saint Paul did, when he said that faith alone teaches us this. God is demonstrated only by faith. […] I do not seek to destroy; I merely demonstrate that nothing has been solidly established in these important questions.”

In the spring of 1805, Dupuis published a Dissertation on the Phoenix. Interpreting a passage from Tacitus's Annals, he argued that the rebirth of the mythical bird symbolized the completion of the Sothic cycle.

In 1806, he published an Explanatory Memoir on the Chronological and Mythological Zodiac, (Note: The memoir concluded with a summary table and the words: “Sooner or later a man of genius will make use of this table, and it is to him that I dedicate it.”) in which he referred to a future comparative study of cosmogonies that was never completed. (Note: Nicolas Ruault attributed this to self-censorship: “The author, naturally timid, feared offending the government and the clergy by publishing this work and thereby disturbing his peace. He had nevertheless removed the Mosaic cosmogony from it, reducing the number of cosmogonies discussed from twenty-two to twenty-one.” After Dupuis's death, Volney and Destutt de Tracy purchased part of his papers from his widow but ultimately abandoned plans to publish the manuscript, which has since disappeared.)

The same year, Dupuis published a memoir on the Dendera zodiac, discovered during the Egyptian campaign by General Louis Desaix. Analysing the drawing made by Vivant Denon, he rejected the interpretation proposed by Visconti, (Note: Visconti dated the zodiac to the first century BC.) arguing instead that the equinoctial and solstitial points represented on the relief referred to an antediluvian age. Gian Domenico Testa challenged this interpretation, which conflicted with Biblical chronology.

Following Jean-François Champollion's work some twenty-five years later, a scholarly consensus emerged dating the Dendera zodiac to the first century BC. Champollion reproached Dupuis and his followers for attributing to the hieroglyphs “the meaning that best suited their a priori explanations”, without ever having correctly deciphered a single cartouche.

Dupuis's interpretation of the Dendera zodiac was also criticized by his colleagues at the Institute. In a report submitted to Napoleon I in 1808, while acknowledging the originality of his research, they concluded that it had suffered from an excessive “spirit of system”.

Charles-François Dupuis died suddenly of a fever on 29 September 1809, aged sixty-six, at the Château du Fossé near Is-sur-Tille (Côte-d'Or), a former national property that he had purchased in 1796.

He was succeeded as professor of Latin rhetoric at the Collège de France by Pierre-Antoine Guéroult.

His eulogy at the Institut de France was delivered on 3 July 1812 by Bon-Joseph Dacier, Permanent Secretary of the Académie des Inscriptions et Belles-Lettres.

A portrait of Dupuis – now lost – was painted during his lifetime in 1808 by Adélaïde Binart.

== Freemasonry ==
Dupuis does not appear to have been a Freemason. In his treatise on the ancient mystery cults, he wrote:

“Our Masonic societies (and the initiations were nothing else than Freemasonry) attract new brethren only through the supposed secret of Freemasonry, which everyone wishes to discover. Curiosity leads us to them; an oath and a measure of vanity bind us to them. We are quite content to leave others in the same ignorance in which we ourselves once were, and from which curiosity may deliver them whenever they choose to be initiated.”

His friend Lalande, who encouraged him to publish his theories in the late 1770s, founded the Lodge of the Nine Sisters, which was presided over by Benjamin Franklin.

Abbé Lefranc and Abbé Barruel, pioneers of Masonic conspiracy theories about the French Revolution, cited Dupuis, alongside Lalande and Volney, among the conspirators responsible for “the fall of the Altar and the Throne.”

After Dupuis's death, Abbé Grégoire, who had known him during the Revolution and the Consulate (Note: Pierre René Auguis, in his biographical notice on Dupuis (1822 edition of The Origin of All Religious Worship), relates the following anecdote: “One day, noticing Dupuis among the members of an Institute delegation received in audience, Napoleon said to him: 'Is it not true, Monsieur Dupuis, that Jesus Christ never existed?' 'Sire, that is my opinion,' replied the author of The Origin of All Religious Worship. On another occasion, when Dupuis was dining with General Bonaparte, then First Consul, Bonaparte noticed that he was conversing amicably with Bishop Grégoire, seated beside him. Surprised that two men holding such diametrically opposed religious views could be on friendly terms, he asked the Bishop of Blois how Dupuis's opinions did not raise an insurmountable barrier between them. 'It should,' replied Grégoire, 'but Dupuis and I share a common religion: the religion of the Republic.'”), claimed that the author of The Origin of All Religious Worship was a Knight Templar, asserting that he had been admitted in 1782. Grégoire believed the Larmenius Charter to be authentic – today it is recognized as a forgery produced by the Freemason Bernard-Raymond Fabré-Palaprat – and therefore accepted the idea that the Templars had survived continuously in secret since the suppression of the order in the early fourteenth century. (Note: According to Grégoire, the Duke of Brissac had entrusted the charter to Jacques-Philippe Ledru. He also listed numerous supposed members of the Order from the seventeenth century onwards, including Samuel Bochart, Fénelon, Massillon, and Abbé Barthélemy (Dupuis's patron at the Académie des Inscriptions et Belles-Lettres); aristocrats such as Frederick the Great, Prince Augustus Frederick, Duke of Sussex, and Duke Alexander of Württemberg; scholars including Lacépède and Palisot de Beauvois; the diplomat Pierre Adet; General Laroche and the British Admiral William Sidney Smith.) No documentary evidence supports the claim that Dupuis belonged to any secret society.

His astronomical interpretation of religion inspired several Masonic writers, including Alexandre Lenoir – a confirmed Neo-Templar who was likewise mentioned by Abbé Grégoire – and Jean-Marie Ragon, and later, under the French Third Republic, Eugène Le Roy.

Dupuis's materialism was criticized by some contemporary Freemasons associated with Illuminism, including Louis-Claude de Saint-Martin and Jean-Baptiste Willermoz both members of the Élus Coëns, the order founded by Martinez de Pasqually. (Note: See also the refutation published by Édouard Richer, a disciple of Emanuel Swedenborg (Essai sur l'origine des constellations anciennes, Nantes, 1818).)

== Honours ==
- Knight of the Legion of Honour (25 April 1806)

Dupuis was among the few members of the Institute not appointed by Napoleon to the first class of the Legion of Honour in 1804.

== Bibliography ==
- Pauvros, Céline (2013). La raison et la nation : Charles-François Dupuis (1742–1809), historien des religions et républicain : itinéraire social, politique et intellectuel d'un philosophe à la fin des Lumières [Reason and the Nation: Charles-François Dupuis (1742–1809), Historian of Religions and Republican: The Social, Political, and Intellectual Trajectory of a Philosopher in the Late Enlightenment] (PhD thesis in history). École des hautes études en sciences sociales.
