= Rouvier =

Rouvier is a surname of French origin. Notable people with the surname include:

- Jacqueline Rouvier (born 1949), French alpine ski racer
- Jacques Rouvier (born 1947), French pianist
- Maurice Rouvier (1842–1911), French statesman
- Marius Rouvier (1903–1981), French racing cyclist
- Pierre Rouvier (1741–1818), French miniature portrait painter.
