= Lié Louis Périn-Salbreux =

French artist

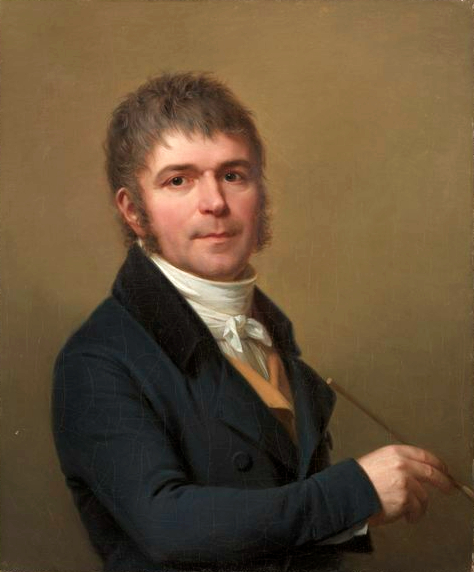
Self-portrait with Brush in Hand (1790s)

Lié Louis Périn-Salbreux (12 October 1753 – 20 December 1817) was a French portrait painter, pastelist and miniaturist.

== Biography ==
Périn-Salbreux was born and died in Reims. He came from a family of textile manufacturers. As he had four older brothers who had already entered the textile business, his father wanted him to become a priest. He was interested in art, however, and went against his wishes by taking drawing classes under the direction of Jean-François Clermont, a local designer and watercolorist.

In 1778, he moved to Paris, without a patron or much money, and made a living painting miniatures, while frequenting the workshops of Anicet Charles Gabriel Lemonnier and Louis Marie Sicard. His career was given its start, however, when he was commissioned to create miniature versions of several paintings by Alexander Roslin. This also gave him the opportunity to make his style more sophisticated. By 1781, he had acquired a reputation and was displaying his works at the Salon. Although he liked to call himself the "painter of the bourgeoisie", his clients included several high-ranking people.

The French Revolution left him unable to finish one major project but, overall, his work was not interrupted. Many, in fear of death, wanted to leave portraits for their families. On a few occasions, he was allowed to enter the prisons to do his sketches. He acquired a small fortune, but the conversion to paper money rendered it virtually worthless. Concern for his wife, Anne-Félicité, and their two children led him to leave Paris and return to Reims in 1799. She entered the family's textile business, but he remained a painter and would occasionally visit Paris to keep up with the latest trends.

Their son, Alphonse, also displayed some artistic talent, so he taught him to draw from life, then sent him to Paris to study with Pierre-Narcisse Guérin and Jean-Victor Bertin.

== Selected paintings ==
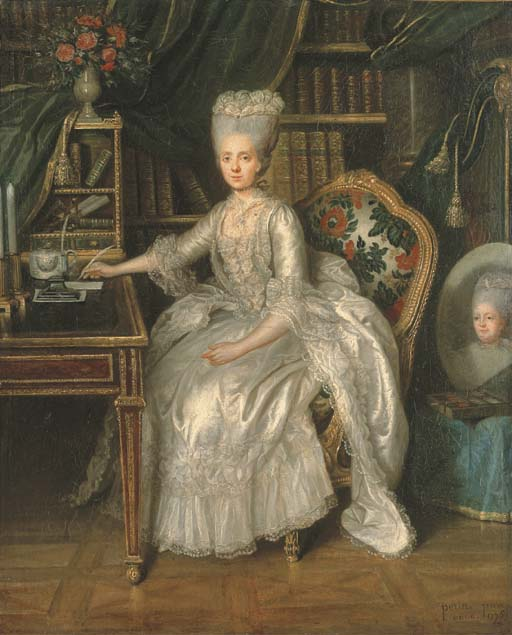
Madame Adélaïde

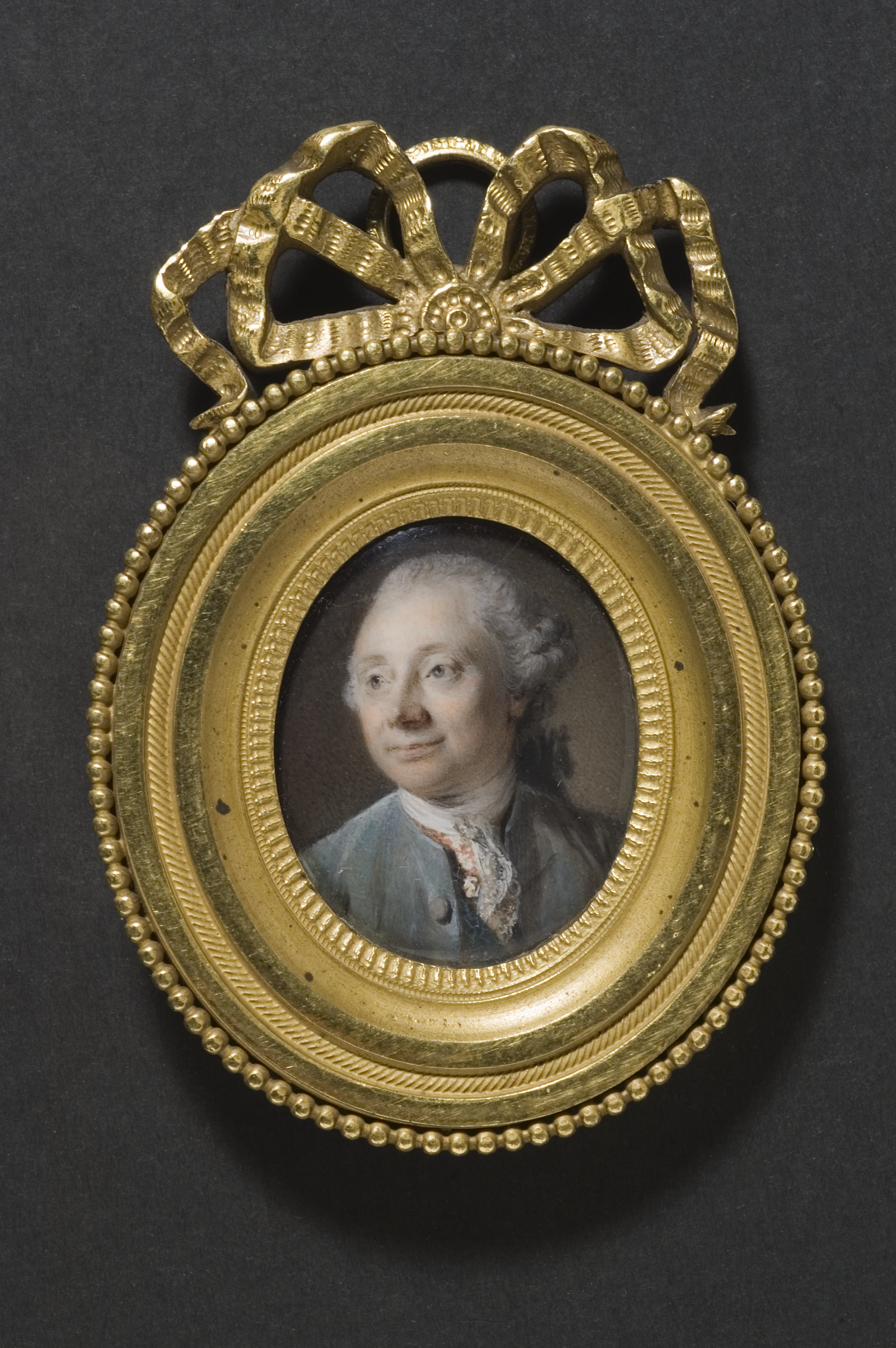
Alexander Roslin

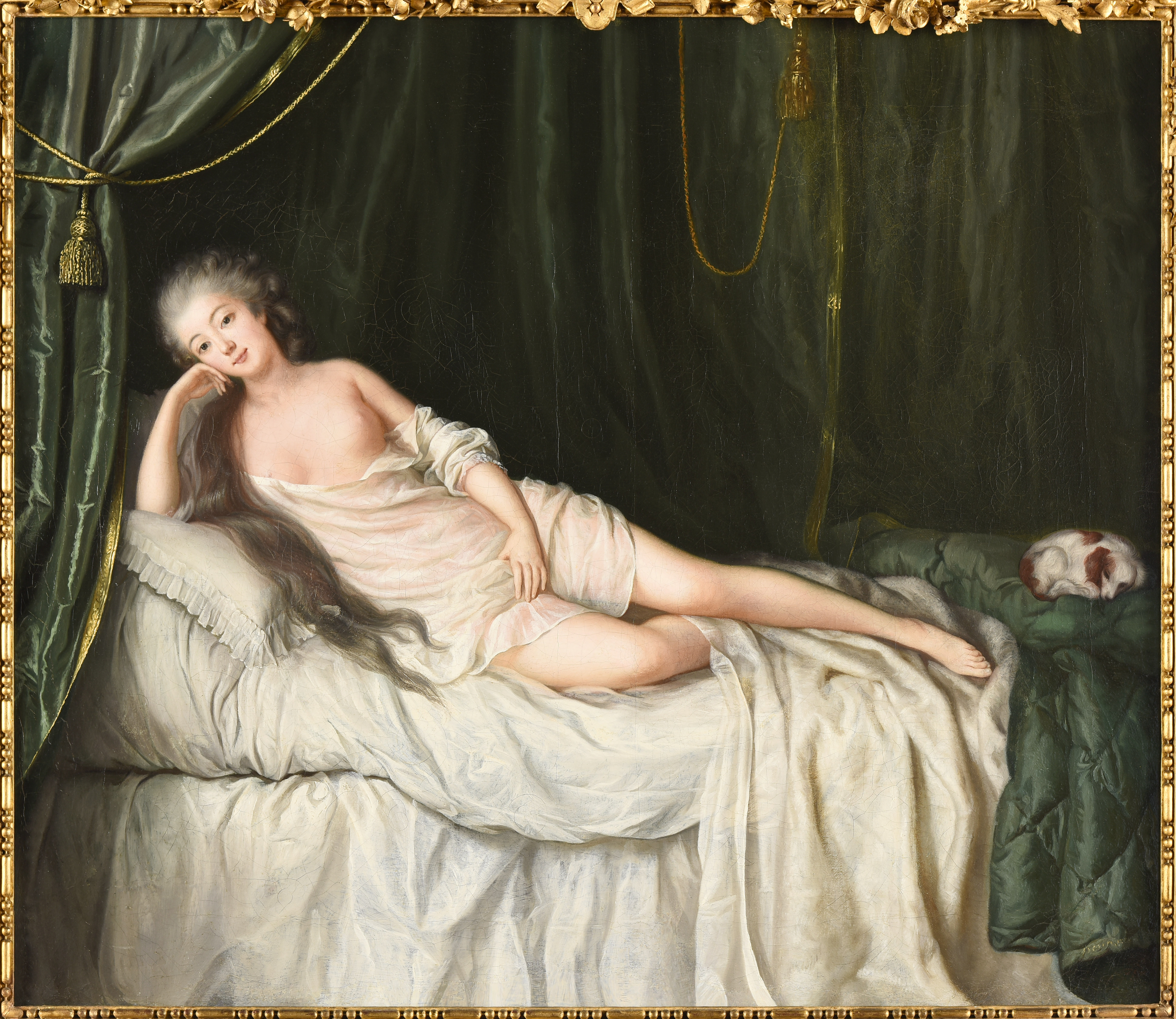
Rosalie Duthé (courtesan)

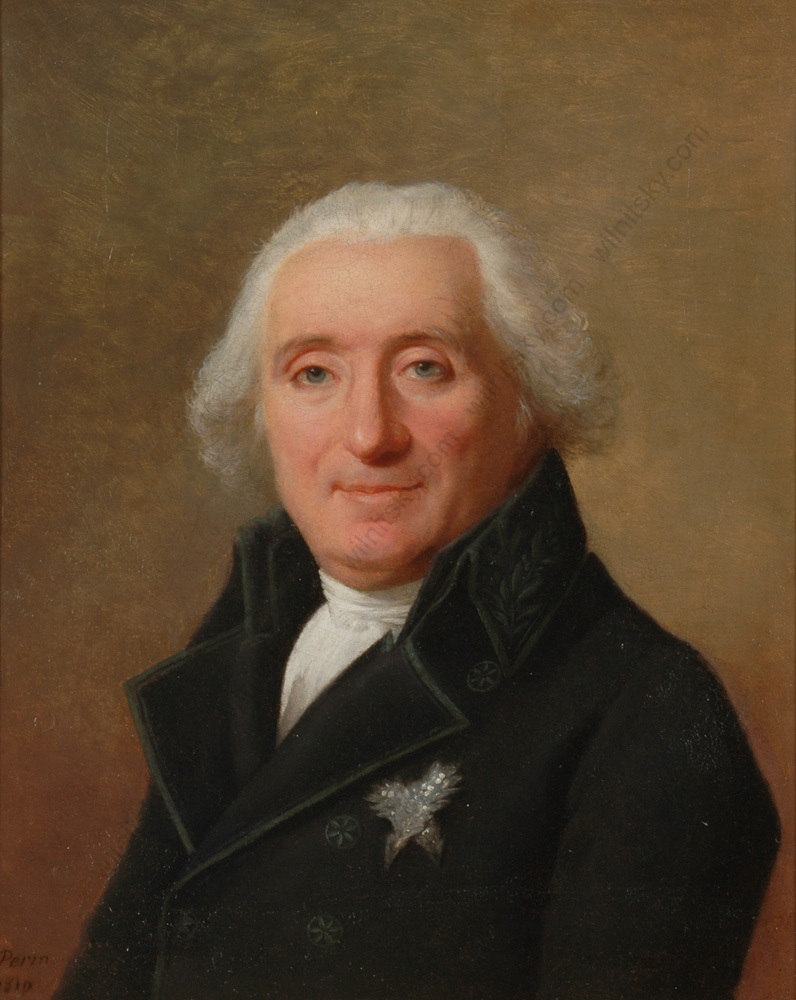
Nicolas Conteray Lallemant
(mathematician)

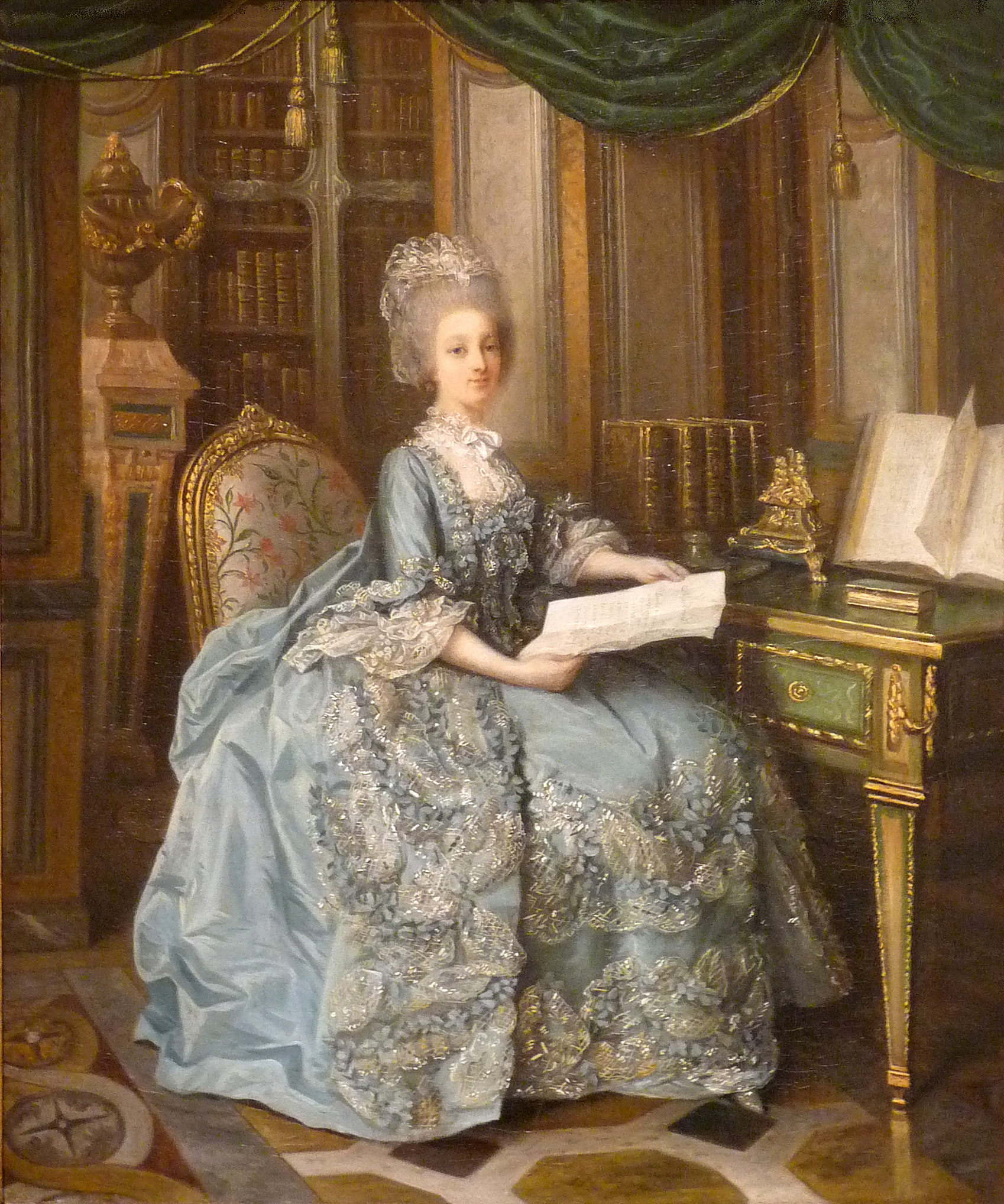
La Petite Reine (once thought to be Marie Antoinette)
