= Jean-François Clermont =

French painter, designer and etcher

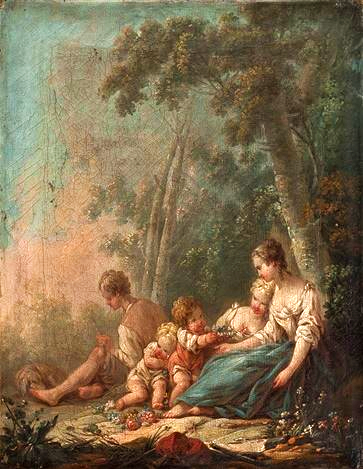
An Allegory of Love

Jean-François Clermont (1717 – 9 April 1807) was a French painter, designer and etcher.

== Biography ==
He was born in Paris. He may have been a descendent of Jean Clermont (1630-?), a student of Eustache Le Sueur, who was originally from Chartres. Nothing is known of his early life or studies. At some point, he left France and spent several years in England.

In 1754 he returned to Paris. Two years later, he participated in an exhibition at the Académie de Saint-Luc. In 1760, the "Académie de Reims" chose him to be their new Professor of Drawing. He was paid 1,500 Livres and began with eighteen students, including Lié Louis Périn-Salbreux, Nicolas Perseval, and Jean-Baptiste Germain. His tenure there was, however, fraught with problems.

At a local fair, in 1768, a print dealer was found with three boxes full of prints and drawings which he said were bought from Clermont for 105 Livres. Upon being questioned, Clermont dismissed it as a simple case of "thoughtlessness". By 1779, he was complaining of the many annoyances created by his pupils and fellow faculty members. His resignation was accepted, and a successor chosen, when the city of Reims begged him to stay, offering him a bonus of 200 Livres to do so. In the end, he would remain until the school was abolished during the Revolution. He found a position at another school, but the times were not favorable to the arts.

In 1795, during the construction of the École centrale in Châlons, he was offered a position similar to the one he held at the Académie, but it did not live up to his expectations. In 1803, he sold his remaining paintings and drawings. He died in poverty, four years later, in Reims.

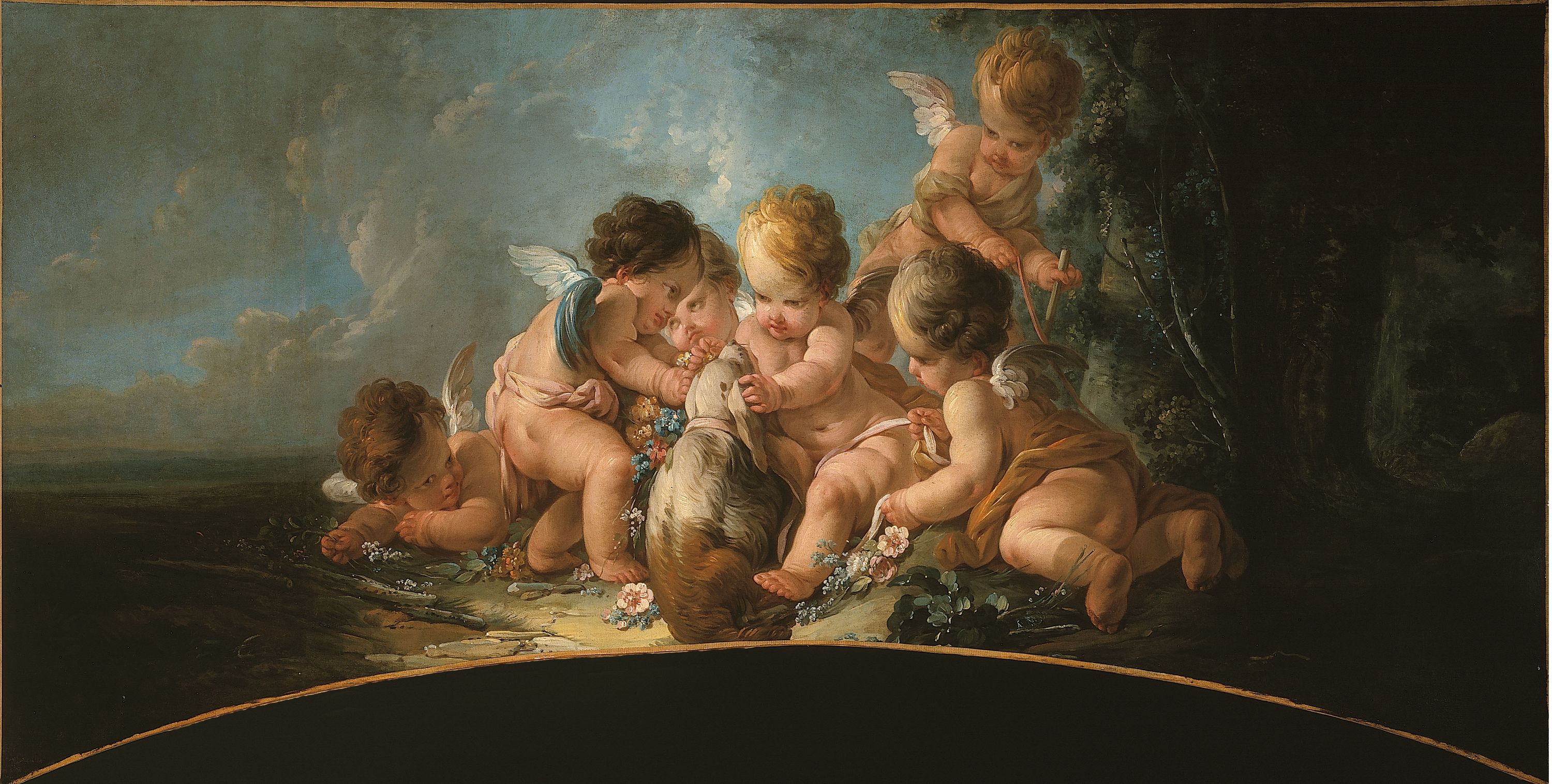
Six Putti Playing with a Dog

His decorative paintings may still be seen at many homes in the area. The Carnegie Library of Reims has a large collection of his pencil drawings and some engravings.
