= Benjamin-Sigismond Frossard =

Swiss pastor and abolitionist

- Born: 23 August 1754; Nyon, Switzerland
- Died: 3 January 1830 (aged 75); Montauban, France
- Occupations: Pastor, theologian, professor
- Known for: Abolitionist activism
- Spouse: Marianne Amélie Drouin
- Children: 8

Benjamin-Sigismond Frossard (23 August 1754 – 3 January 1830) was a Swiss Protestant pastor, professor of theology, and abolitionist. He was from Moudon and Nyon.

== Early life and education ==
Benjamin-Sigismond Frossard was the son of Gabriel Frossard, a justicier of the city of Nyon, and Jeanne-Françoise Ronzel. He completed secondary studies at the college of Lausanne in 1768, then studied theology in Geneva from 1771.

== Career ==
Ordained in 1777, Frossard served as pastor in Zweibrücken in the Palatinate, in Appenzell (1778–1780), and in Lyon (1780–1803). He was professor of moral philosophy at the central school of Clermont-Ferrand in 1793. In 1810, he became the first dean of the Protestant theological faculty of Montauban, where he presided over the consistory and taught moral philosophy in 1815. Deprived of his pastoral and decanal functions during the Revolution and the Empire, he retained his status as a faculty professor.

== Personal life ==
In 1785, Frossard married Marianne Amélie Drouin, daughter of Paul-Etienne Drouin, an entrepreneur at the royal cloth manufacture of Sedan in the Ardennes. The couple had eight children.

== Abolitionist activism ==
Frossard campaigned against the slave trade. During a trip to England in 1784–1785, he met the main representatives of the British abolitionist movement, notably Thomas Clarkson. In recognition of his commitment, he received an honorary doctorate from the University of Oxford in 1785. In France, he became active in anti-slavery movements, such as the Society of the Friends of the Blacks, founded in 1788, and later the Society of the Friends of the Blacks and the Colonies (1794).

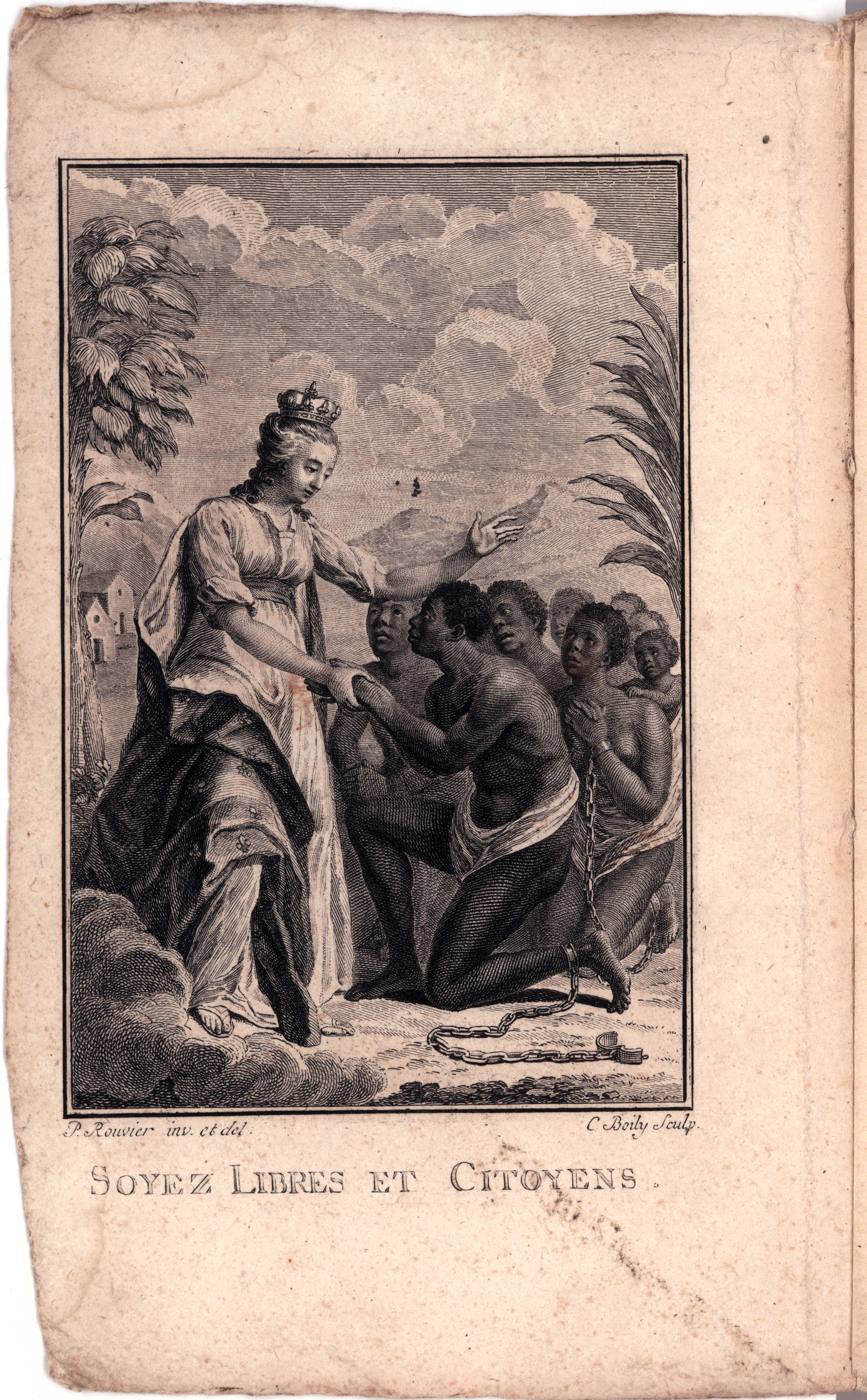
La cause des esclaves nègres et des habitans de la Guinée, portée au tribunal de la justice, de la religion, de la politique […], frontispiece of Pierre Rouvier engraved by Charles-Ange Boily, Lyon, 1789.

The publication in 1789 of La cause des esclaves nègres et des habitans de la Guinée (The Cause of Black Slaves and the Inhabitants of Guinea), considered today as one of the most important works in French on the subject, made him famous. At the end of 1792, he also addressed a decisive text to the French National Convention regarding the future abolition of slavery.

=== Philosophy and arguments ===
As a man of the Church as well as a man of the Enlightenment, Frossard considered engagement in the abolition of the slave trade and slavery essentially as a struggle against scourges from which Christian morality should emerge victorious. While he emphasized ethics, he occasionally had to resort to economic arguments, taken from British abolitionists, to refute pro-slavery discourse. According to this argument, the emancipation of slaves in the American colonies would make them more productive; by improving their condition, it would encourage them to reproduce; the increase in population would stimulate demand for products manufactured in Europe. Thus, abolition would not only be ethically just but also economically useful.

For Frossard, however, the abolitionist struggle remained above all a fight between vices and virtues. Accused of being the source of all evils, the slave trade was, for him, the work of the depraved, consumed by their vile passions. Conversely, those who were committed to its abolition were virtuous beings. In short, putting an end to this injustice meant making good triumph over evil. Just as Frossard's morality was drawn from the Gospels, his conception of human rights, supposedly conferred by God, was religious. Fighting to free enslaved women and men and make them citizens was, for him, to conform to divine design.

== Bibliography ==
=== Works by Frossard ===
- Frossard, Benjamin-Sigismond (1789). La cause des esclaves nègres et des habitans de la Guinée, Portée au Tribunal de la Justice, de la Religion, de la Politique; ou Histoire de la Traite & de l'Esclavage des Nègres, Preuves de leur illégitimité, Moyens de les abolir sans nuire ni aux Colonies ni aux Colons. 2 vols. (reprint 1978).

=== Secondary sources ===
- Blanc, Robert (2000). Un pasteur du temps des Lumières. Benjamin-Sigismond Frossard (1754-1830) (2nd ed. 2017).
- Zorn, Jean-François (2004). "Benjamin-Sigismond Frossard et Guillaume de Félice: Deux théologiens protestants anti-esclavagistes". Etudes théologiques et religieuses, 79(4), pp. 493–509.
- Grenouilleau, Olivier (2018). "Le discours d'un pasteur abolitionniste en son siècle". Revue d'histoire du protestantisme, 3, pp. 395–410.
