= Dieudonné Thiébault =

French intellectual (1733–1807)

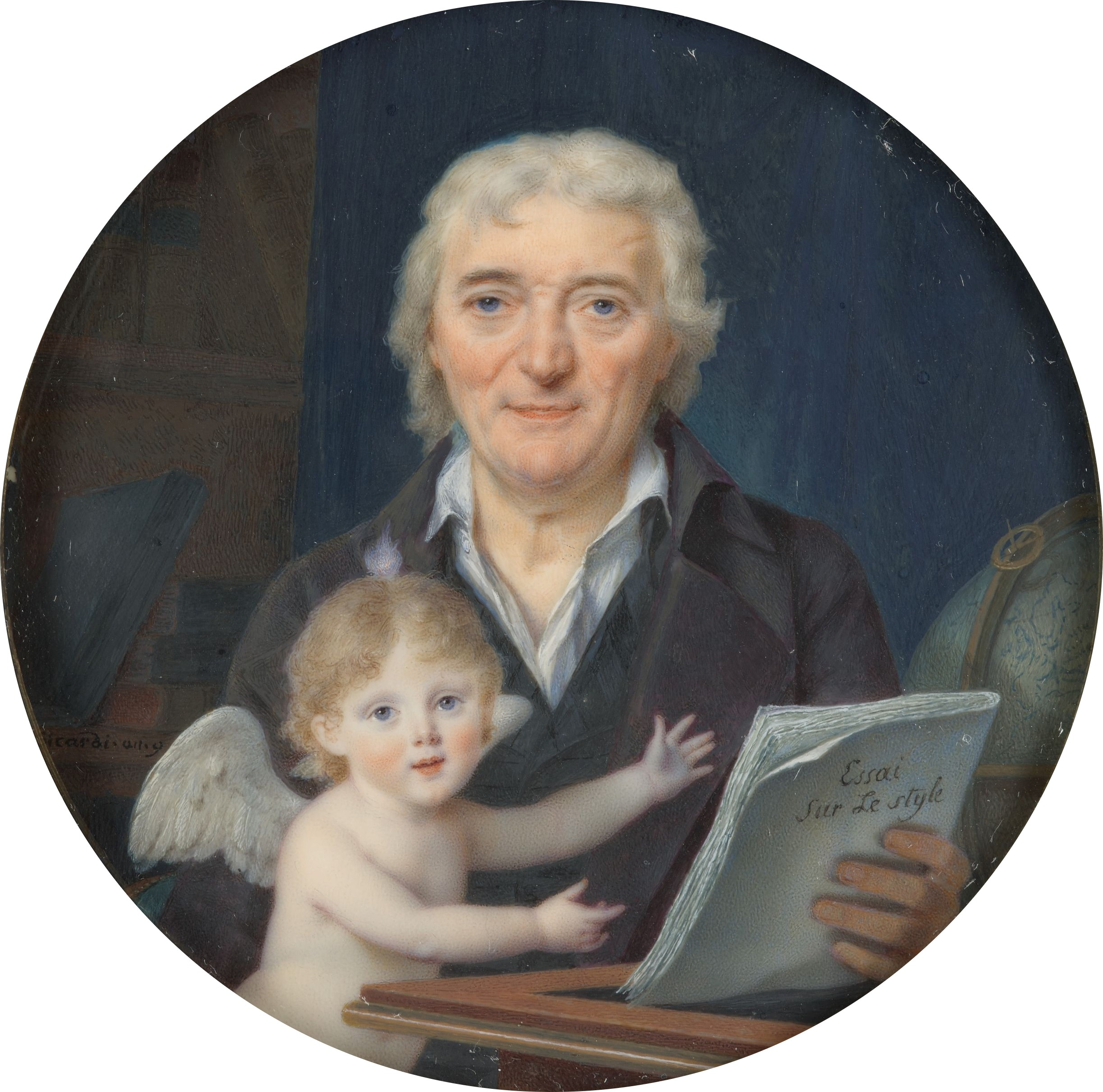
Dieudonné Thiébault and his grandson Adolphe, three years old, 1800-1801, miniature by Sicardi

Dieudonné Thiébault (La Roche, December 26, 1733 — Versailles, December 5, 1807) was a French man of letters.

== Early life and education ==
Thiébault was brought up by the Jesuits who, struck by his keen intelligence, urged him to enter their order, which he did, without however receiving priesthood. Thiébault was taught the humanities, and at the same time he devoted himself to literary work and wrote French and Latin poetry.

In 1762, he left the Jesuits and began to study law.

== Career ==
Then he moved to Paris, and decided to follow the career of literature. He entered into relations with the most distinguished men of the literary circles, and earned a fame for himself through published works. In 1765, on the recommendation of d'Alembert and d'Olivet, he became the chair of grammar at the Prussian Academy of Sciences.

Welcomed by Frederick the Great, he soon gained the full confidence of the king, became the reader of all that he sent to the Prussian Academy of Sciences, the corrector of a large number of his works, and the publisher of almost everything he had sent to be published. For twenty years, Thiébault maintained a close relation with Frederick, who had given him a pension and a place at the Academy.

In 1784, he returned to France and settled there. It was then that he entered two projects, one on the formation of a fire insurance company, the other on the reorganization of the Library of France. The first of these projects was rejected as unworkable, though it was later realized; the second so pleased Vidaud de La Tour, Director-General of the Library of France, that he appointed him head of his offices (1785). Subsequently, he obtained custody of the archives and inventories of the Garde-Meuble de la Couronne.

During the Estates General of 1789, Thiébault received the privilege of creating the only newspaper which would be authorized to report on the assembly, and was charged, at the beginning of the Revolution, with the management of the Library of France.

Shortly after, he lost the various functions he held; but, as he was receptive to new ideas, he successively became inspector of rolls at Épinal, commissioner for the reunion of Tournaisis with France, director of a post office for horses, head of the secretariat of the Directory (1795), and president of the École centrale de la rue Saint-Antoine (which occupied the premises of the modern Lycée Charlemagne), where he taught grammar (1799). Finally, in 1803, he was appointed headmaster of the Lycée de Versailles.

== Personal life ==
His son was Paul Thiébault.

He died at Versailles on December 5, 1807. On July 22, 1820, his body is transferred to Paris by his son, to the Père Lachaise cemetery (39th division).

== Works ==
He mainly published articles in Recueil de l'Académie de Berlin, Literary Journal of this city (1772–1776), and Journal de l'instruction publique (1793–1794). Other writings include

- Apologie des jeunes ex-jésuites qui ont signé le serment prescript par arrêt du 6 février 1764. 1764,
- Discours sur la prononciation. Berlin, 1765
- Les adieux du duc de Bourgogne et de l’abbé de Fénelon ou Dialogues sur les différentes formes de gouvernement. 1772
- Essai synthétique sur l’origine et la formation des langues. 1774
- De l’enseignement dans les écoles centrales. 1796
- Traité Sur L’Esprit Public, Levrault u. a., Strasbourg, 1797/1798, (digital, Bavarian State Library.).
- Traité du style, Lavillette, Paris, 1801

- Tome Premier, (digital, Bavarian State Library.).
- Tome Second, (digital, Bavarian State Library.).

- Grammaire philosophique, ou la métaphysique, la logique, et la grammaire, réunies en und seul corps de doctrine, Courcier, Paris, 1802

- Tome Premier, (digital, Bavarian State Library.).
- Tome Second, (digital, Bavarian State Library.).

- Principes de lecture et de prononciation. 1802
- Mes souvenirs de vingt ans de séjour a Berlin ou Fréderic le Grand, sa famille, sa cour, son gouvernement, son Académie, ses écoles, et ses amis littérateurs et philosophes, (Note: There is a two-volume translation into German.)

- Frédéric le Grand, Tome Premier, (digital, Bavarian State Library.).
- Frédéric et sa famille, Tome Second, (digital, Bavarian State Library.).
- Frédéric, sa cour, les voyageurs et les ministres étrangers, Tome Troisieme, (digital, Bavarian State Library.).
- Frédéric et son gouvernement civil et militaire, Tome Quatrieme, (digital, Bavarian State Library.).
- Frédéric, son Académie, ses écoles et ses amis littérateurs et philosophes, Tome Cinquieme, (digital, Bavarian State Library.).
