= Pierre Rouvier =

French miniature painter (1741–1818)

- Born: 8 September 1741; Aix-en-Provence, France
- Died: 19 October 1818 (aged 77); Perpignan, France
- Known for: Miniature portrait painting

Pierre Rouvier (born 8 September 1741, in Aix-en-Provence – died 19 October 1818, in Perpignan) was a French miniature portrait painter.

== Biography ==
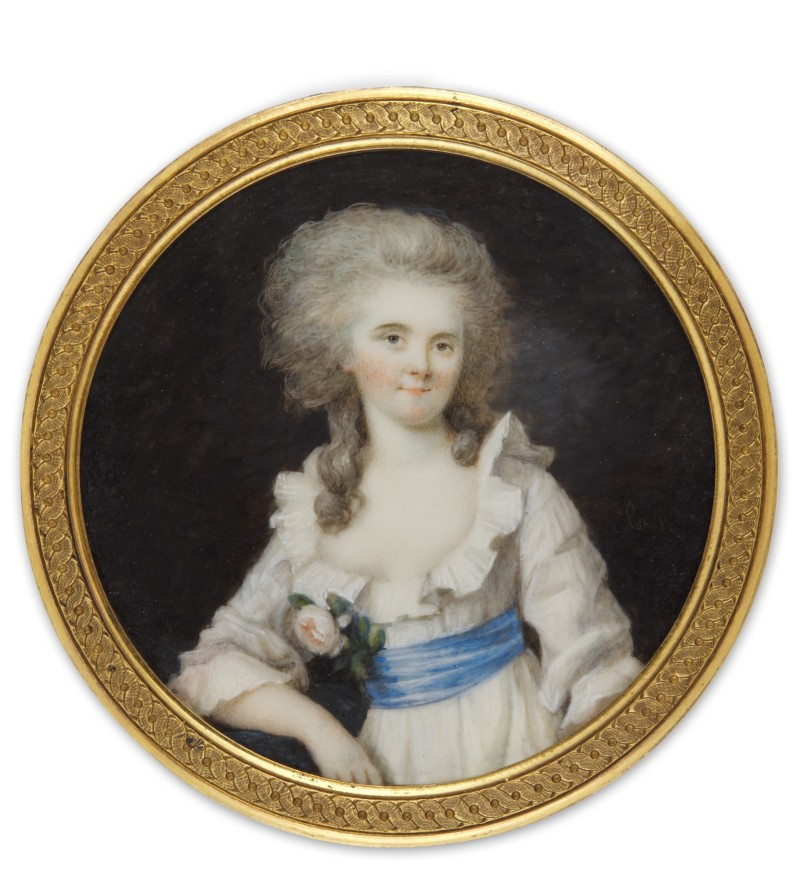
Portrait of Ursula Funguerlin, née Scherer (watercolor on ivory, 1781, signed), formerly in the Erika Pohl collection, present location unknown.

Originally from Provence, Rouvier moved to Paris and was admitted to the Académie royale de peinture et de sculpture in January 1770, under the patronage of the painter and teacher François d'André-Bardou (1700–1783),and was recommended by the Marquis de Marigny.

Influenced by Pierre Adolphe Hall, he exhibited portraits and genre scenes in the form of miniatures at the Salon de la Correspondance in 1779 and 1782, organized by Pahin de La Blancherie. His style subsequently evolved to become closer to that of Louis Marie Sicard.

After 1786, his works became rarer and allowed the artist to express himself in a freer style, introducing more ambitious compositions with accessories.

At the time of the French Revolution, he supplied designs engraved by Charles-Ange Boily, including the frontispiece for Benjamin-Sigismond Frossard's essay La Cause des esclaves negres et des habitans de la Guinée (Lyon, 1789). The Courrier patriotique des départements de l'Isère... reported that he was living in Lyon in January 1793, where he appears to have had significant connections, including the miniature painter Louis-Marie Dulieu de Chenevoux, who painted his portrait.

He should not be confused with the Swiss painter Daniel Jean Louis Rouvière (1750–1825).

=== Family ===
Pierre Rouvier was baptized at the Church of Sainte-Madeleine in Aix-en-Provence on 8 September 1741. He was the son of Pierre Rouvier and Louise Salomon, who were married in the same parish on 10 February 1739. The couple had other children: Marthe-Pauline the following year, on 9 August 1742; Joseph-Louis on 20 August 1744; and Laurent-Toussaint on 31 October 1747.

In 1773, he married Rose Gaudin in Chambéry, a native of that city. The marriage record indicates that he was then residing in Grenoble. On May 11, 1774, their first son of Pierre and Rosa, named Étienne, was baptized in the parish of Saint-Hugues in Grenoble. The child died a few days later. Another son, Pierre-Ambroise-Hippolyte, was born on August 7, 1775.Rouvier probably settled in Paris around 1776 or 1777. Another of his children, Antoine-Charles Rouvier, died in Paris in May 1778 in the Petit-Montrouge district; he was nine months old at the time.The Grenoble archives do not record his baptism in the parish of Saint-Hugues during the summer of 1777, suggesting that Rouvier was already in the capital. Another child was born in Paris in 1779, named Antoine-Denis. From the latter's marriage in Perpignan in 1815,it is known that his parents were living in Villeurbanne, where Rouvier had acquired a plot of land as early as 1793.

Pierre Rouvier and his wife later moved closer to this son and settled in Perpignan, where Pierre died on October 19, 1818, aged 77, followed by Rose on August 2, 1825

== Collections ==
Louvre Museum

- Portrait de femme au corsage bleu clair décolleté (Portrait of a Woman in a Light Blue Low-Cut Bodice), 1781.
- Portrait d'Armand Scipion Urbain, Marquis de Pujol (Portrait of Armand Scipion Urbain, Marquis de Pujol), 1781.
- Une mère et ses deux enfants (A Mother and Her Two Children)
- Portrait d'un petit garçon [attrib.] (Portrait of a Little Boy), miniature on ivory mounted on a dance card case.

Metropolitan Museum of Art

- Boîte avec portrait dit de Mme Bailly (Box with Portrait Known as Madame Bailly) c. 1780–1789.

Napoléon Museum, Arenenberg Castle

- Eugène de Beauharnais, c. 1810.

== Bibliography ==
- Schidlof, Leo R. (1964). La Miniature en Europe: aux 16e, 17e, 18e et 19e siècles (in French). Vol. 1 A - L. Graz: Akademische Druck- u. Verlagsanstalt. OCLC 311942909.
- Lemoine-Bouchard, Nathalie (2008). Les peintres en miniature: actifs en France, 1650-1850 (in French). Paris: Les Éditions de l'Amateur. pp. 448–450. ISBN 978-2-85917-468-2. OCLC 228782729.
- Pappe, Bernd; Schmieglitz-Otten, Juliane; Tansey miniatures foundation (2012). Miniaturen der Zeit Marie Antoinettes: aus der Sammlung Tansey [Ausstellung, Celle, Bomann Museum, 25.1.2013-ca. Ende 2015] (in German). München: Hirmer Verlag GmbH. pp. 284–299. ISBN 978-3-7774-9021-2.
