= Église Saint-Josse de Parnes =

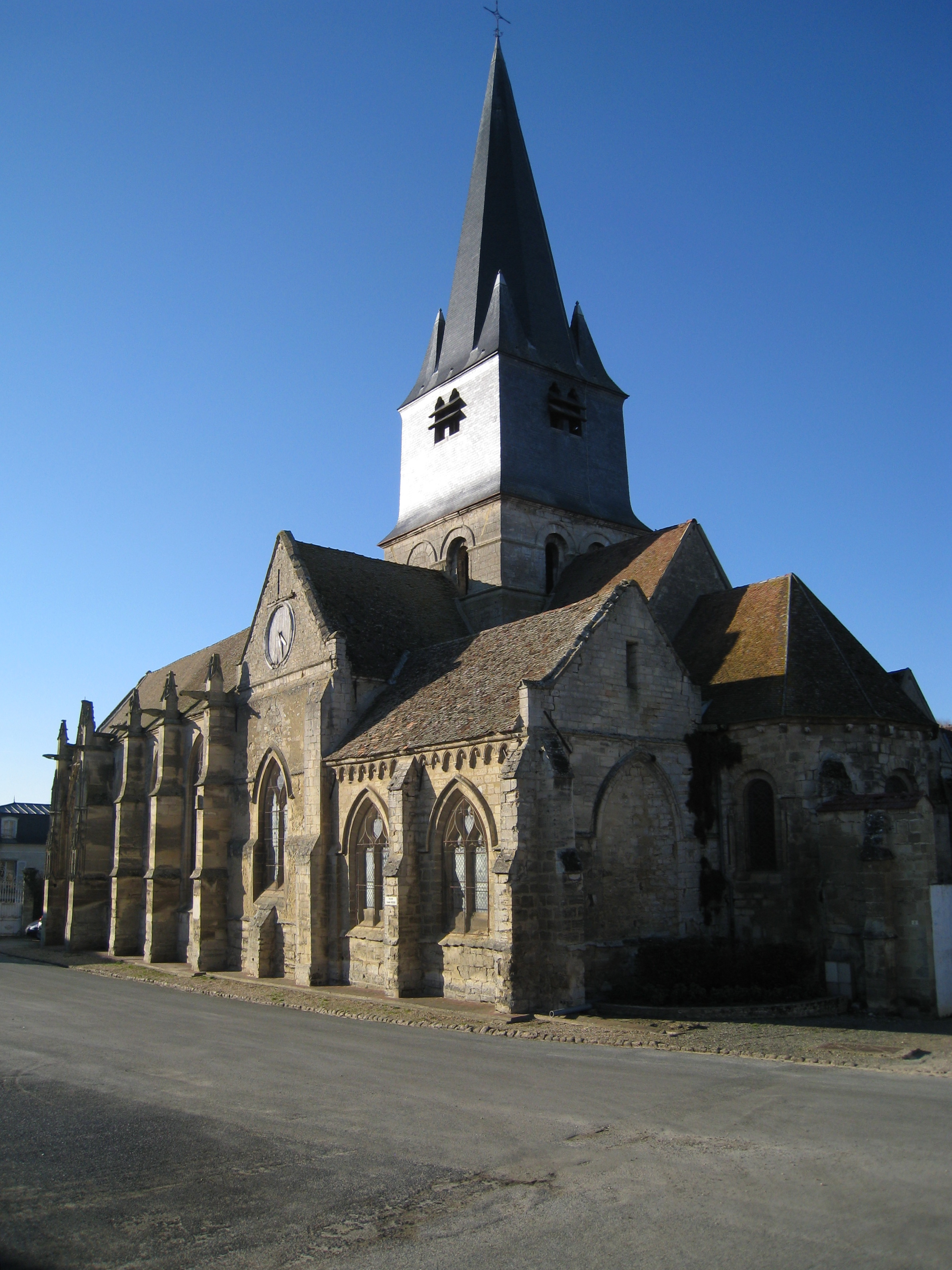
- Église Saint-Josse de Parnes

- Location within France
- 49.203618°N 1.737495°E
- Location: Parnes, France

Site notes
- Architectural style: church

Monument historique
- Designated: 1913

Église Saint-Josse de Parnes is a Roman Catholic church in Parnes, France. It is a monument historique.

== Location ==
The church is located in the Oise department, in the commune of Parnes.

== History ==
It was declared a monument historique in 1913.
