= Échevannes, Côte-d'Or =

Échevannes
- Commune
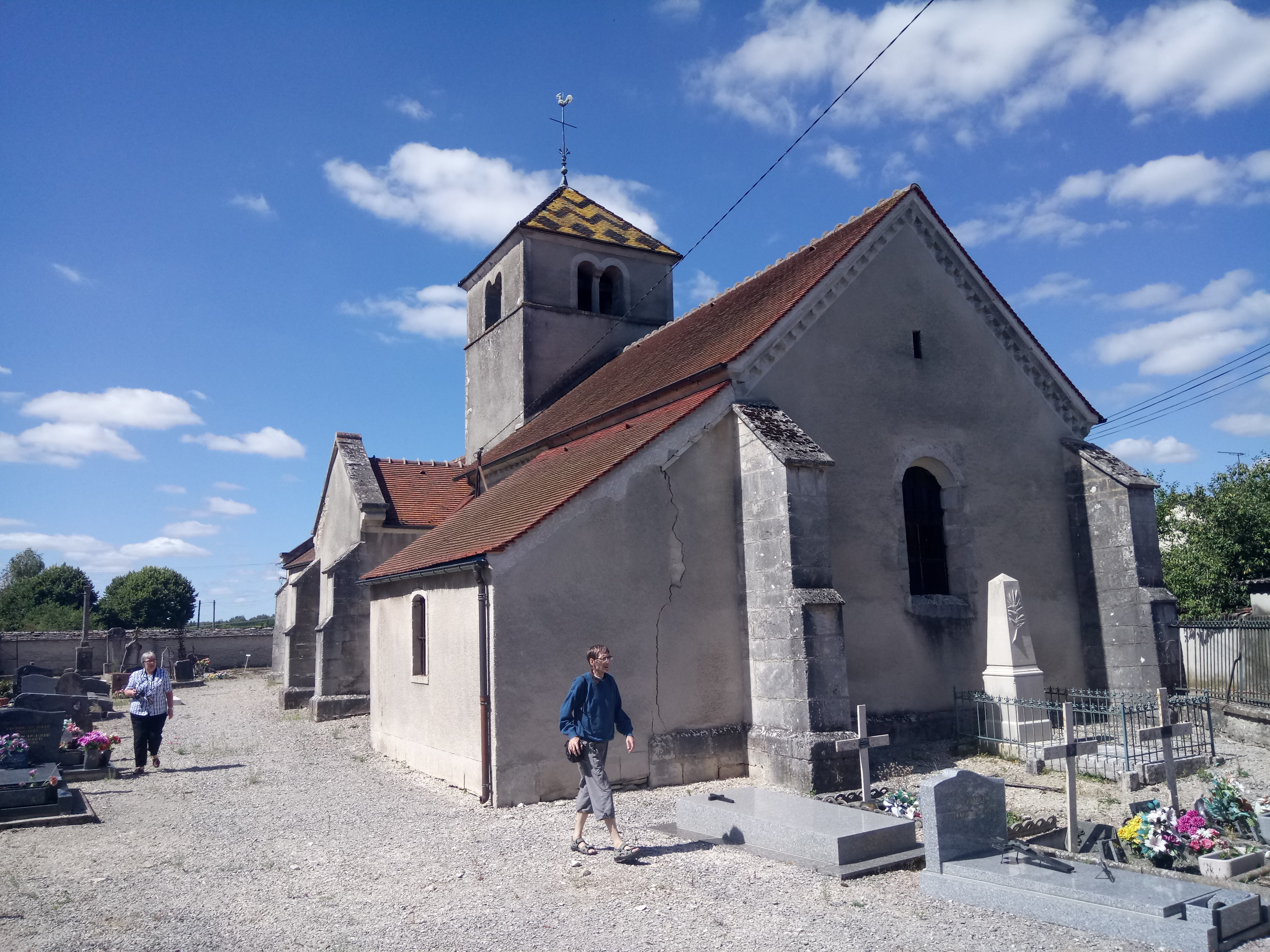
- The church in Échevannes
- Location of Échevannes
- Location within France Location within Bourgogne-Franche-Comté
- Coordinates: 47°31′42″N 5°10′10″E
- Country: France
- Region: Bourgogne-Franche-Comté
- Department: Côte-d'Or
- Arrondissement: Dijon
- Canton: Is-sur-Tille

Government
  - Mayor (2020–2026): Michel Boirin
- Area^{1}: 11.45 km^{2} (4.42 sq mi)
- Elevation: 268 m (879 ft)
- Highest elevation: 356 m (1,168 ft)
- Lowest elevation: 261 m (856 ft)
- Population (2023): 281
  - Density: 24.5/km^{2} (63.6/sq mi)
- Time zone: UTC+01:00 (CET)
  - Summer (DST): UTC+02:00 (CEST)
- INSEE/Postal code: 21240 /21120
- ^{1} French Land Register data, which excludes lakes, ponds, glaciers > 1 km^{2} (0.386 sq mi or 247 acres) and river estuaries.

Échevannes (French pronunciation: [eʃvan]) is a commune in the Côte-d'Or department in eastern France.

== Population ==
Historical population
Year	Pop.	±% p.a.
1968	105	—
1975	78	−4.16%
1982	88	+1.74%
1990	122	+4.17%
1999	147	+2.09%
2007	199	+3.86%
2012	230	+2.94%
2017	299	+5.39%
2023	281	−1.03%
Source: INSEE

== Notable person ==
- Charles François Dupuis (1742–1809), polymath and theologian, died in Échevannes

== See also ==
- Communes of the Côte-d'Or department
