= Jean Henri Bancal des Issarts =

French politician

Jean Henri Bancal des Issarts (3 November 1750, Saint-Martin-de-Londres – 27 May 1826, Paris) was a French politician.

== Life ==
He became a lawyer to the Parlement of Paris then a notary at the Châtelet de Paris, but sold his position in 1788 to concentrate on politics. However, he could not get elected to any role in Paris and so he went to Clermont-Ferrand, where he set up a Society of Friends of the Constitution on the model of the group of the same name in Paris – he also made himself its president. After setbacks at several elections he was elected to the National Convention as member for the department of Puy-de-Dôme. Passionately in love with Manon Roland, he remained under her influence, sat with the moderates in the convention and joined the constitutional committee and the Committee of Public Instruction. He was one of four men sent with the Minister for War Pierre de Ruel to Charles François Dumouriez. He was handed over to the Austrians, though his imprisonment meant that unlike most of his Girondin friends he escaped the guillotine. He was freed in exchange for the daughter of Louis XVI in November 1795 and sat in the Council of Five Hundred until May 1797, but made little impact within it. He then retired to Clermont-Ferrand, where he published Du nouvel ordre social fondé sur la religion (On the new social order founded on religion) and sank into mysticism, studying biblical Hebrew and Greek so as to read the original texts of the Bible.

== Publications ==
- Discours et projets de décret sur l'Éducation Nationale (Speech and plans for the decree on National Education), delivered at the National Convention, 24 December 1792, the first year of the French First Republic. 28 pages, immediately printed in octavo by the Imprimerie Nationale by order of the National Convention and sent to the 84 departments.

== Sources ==
- (in French) "Jean Henri Bancal des Issarts", in Adolphe Robert and Gaston Cougny, Dictionnaire des parlementaires français (1789–1891), Bourloton, Paris, 1889 Edition details Wikisource
- (in Russian) Банкаль – Article from the Brockhaus and Efron Encyclopedic Dictionary
- (in French) Dezobry et Bachelet, Dictionnaire de biographie, t.1, Ch. Delagrave, 1876, p. 215.
- (in French) Fiche sur Assemblée nationale
