= Volney =

Volney may refer to:

- Comte de Volney or Constantin-François de Chassebœuf (1757–1820), French philosopher, historian, orientalist, and politician
- Herbert Volney, a politician from Trinidad and Tobago
- Volney, New York a town in Oswego County, New York, United States
- Volney Prize, an award by the Institut de France

== People with the given name ==
- Volney E. Howard (1809–1889), American lawyer, statesman, and jurist
- Volney Mathison, American experimenter in early biofeedback
- Volney Peters (born 1928), American football player in the NFL
- Volney Rogers (1846–1919), American lawyer
- Volney Morgan Spalding (1849–1918), American botanist
- Volney F. Warner (born 1926), retired United States Army four-star general
