= Paul Thiébault =

French general (1769–1846)

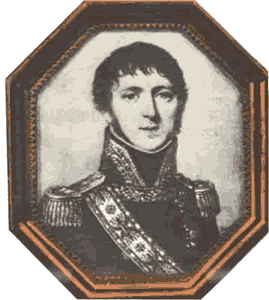
- Paul Thiébault
- Born: 14 December 1769; Berlin, Kingdom of Prussia
- Died: 14 October 1846 (aged 76) Paris, France
- Allegiance: France
- Branch: Infantry
- Rank: General of Division
- Conflicts: War of the First Coalition; Battle of Rivoli; War of the Second Coalition; Siege of Genoa; War of the Third Coalition; Battle of Austerlitz; Peninsular War; War of the Sixth Coalition; Siege of Hamburg
- Other work: Baron of the Empire, 1811

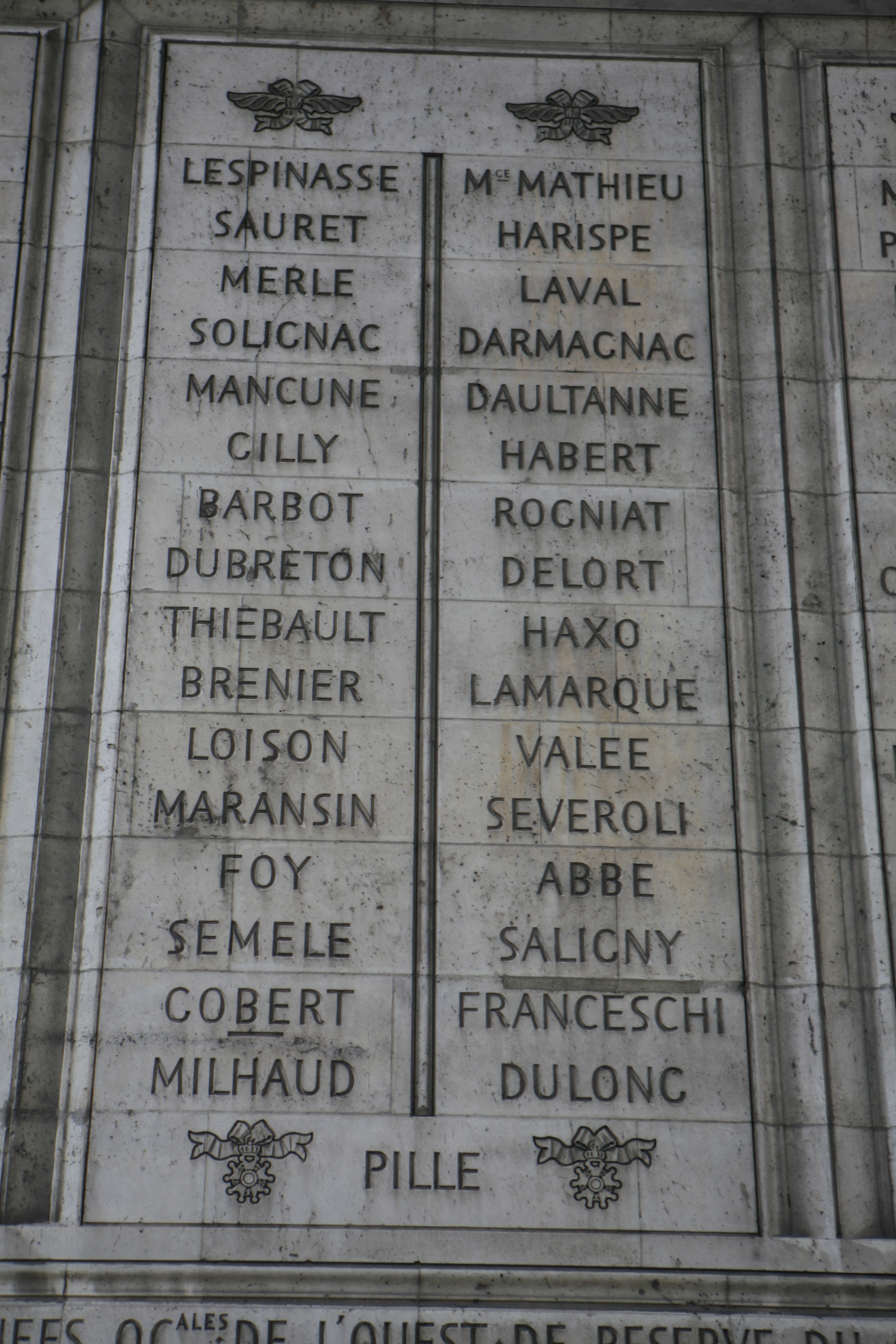
Thiébault's name engraved on the 35th and 36th columns of the Arc de Triomphe.

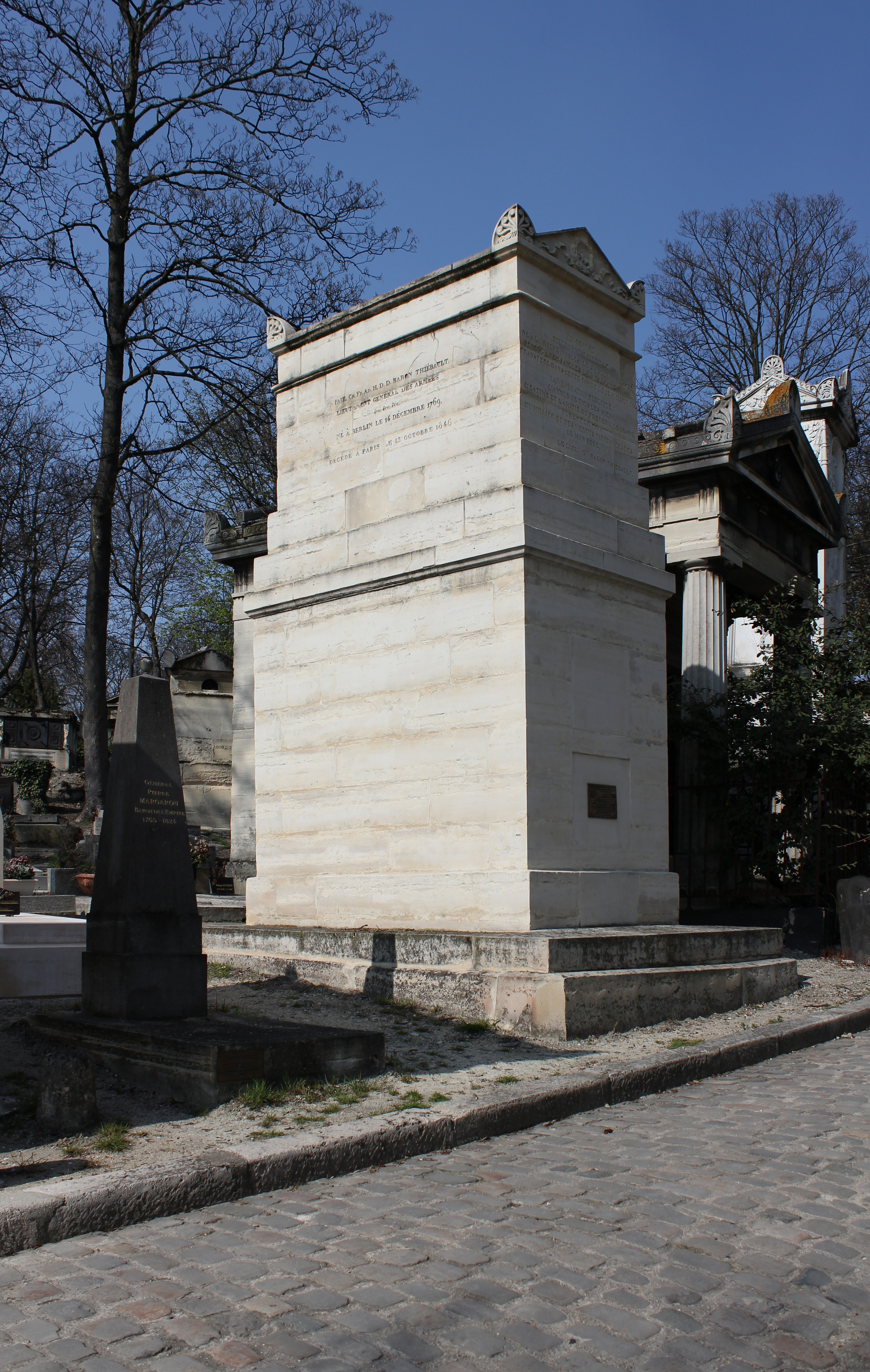
His tomb in the cimetière du Père-Lachaise (division 39).

Paul Charles François Adrien Henri Dieudonné Thiébault (French pronunciation: [pɔl ʃaʁl fʁɑ̃swa adʁijɛ̃ ɑ̃ʁi djødɔne tjebo]; 14 December 1769, Berlin – 14 October 1846, Paris) was a general who fought in Napoleon's army. During his military career he wrote a number of histories and memoirs, the last of which were published in 1895.

== Life ==
His father was Dieudonné Thiébault, a professor in the military school in Berlin and a friend of Frederick the Great. Paul Thiébault moved to France and took up an administrative post, which he remained in until 20 August 1792. On that date he volunteered for the Butte des Moulins battalion, but was invalided out on health grounds the following November. He was implicated in treason accusations aimed at Charles François Dumouriez on 4 April 1793 but succeeded in proving his innocence and rejoined the army, at first in the Armée du Rhin then in the Armée du Nord until 1794. Rising rapidly through the ranks, he was made adjutant to general Solignac in the armée d’Italie in 1795.

He served at the Battle of Rivoli, distinguished himself in the assault on Naples in January 1799 and then retired the following June. Recalled in January 1800, he was attached to the armée d’Italie, where he served on André Masséna's staff at the siege of Genoa. He was made a general in 1801 and commanded the 2nd brigade of the 1st infantry division at the Battle of Austerlitz, in support of Dominique Vandamme, making him part of the army corps which mounted the assault and took the Pratzen plateau. He was wounded during the battle.

He was then made governor of Fulda in October 1806. Next he was transferred to the French army in Portugal, then in Spain, where he remained until 1813. In May 1810 he was made governor of Salamanca and in 1811 of Vieille-Castille. During his time in the Peninsula he also became a divisional general (1808), then a baron (1813). He was then moved to Germany, where he commanded first 40st. and then 50st. infantry division at Hamburg then Lubeck between 1813 and 1814, under the command of Davout. He backed Napoleon during the Hundred Days and was put in command of the defence of Paris. Published in 1895, with an English translation appearing the next year, his memoirs are a useful source for the history of the First French Empire, filling in details and giving often critical assessments of major figures.

== Family ==
His father is Dieudonné Thiébault.

Thiébault married Betsy Walker the daughter of the novelist Lady Mary Hamilton. His son Adolphe (1797-1875) became a military tutor and antiquities collector. Adolphe gathered together the family's papers and these are available at Yale University.

== Works ==
- Journal des opérations militaires du siège et du blocus de Gênes, written in 1801
- Relation de l’expédition du Portugal faite en 1807 et 1808
- Manuel général du service des états-majors généraux et divisionnaires dans les armées
- Mémoires
  - Memoirs of Baron Thiébault (transl. by A. J. Butler), London, 1896
- Du chant, et particulièrement de la romance, 1813
