= Pierre Serna =

French historian (born 1963)

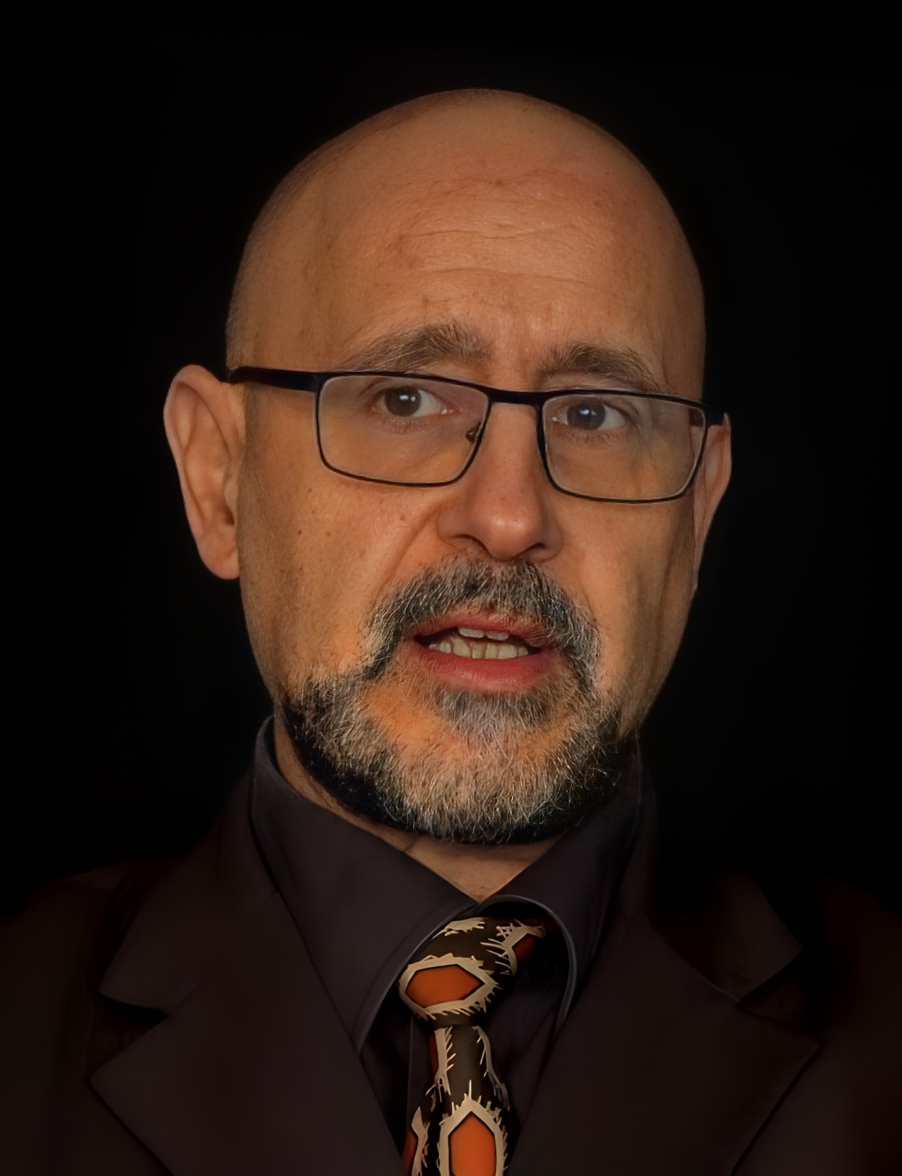
Pierre Serna in 2019

Pierre Serna (born September 28, 1963) is a French historian specializing in the French Revolution. He is a professor at the University of Paris 1 Pantheon-Sorbonne and a member of the Institute of Modern and Contemporary History (IHMC). He previously directed the Institute for the History of the French Revolution (UMS 622 / CNRS) from 2008 until 2015, when it was integrated into the IHMC.

== Biography ==
A former student of the Lycée Masséna in Nice, where he studied history under Émile Llorca, Serna continued his education in Paris at the Lycée Henri-IV and the Lycée Lakanal before entering the University of Paris 1 Pantheon-Sorbonne in 1984. He undertook his first research under the supervision of Michel Vovelle, who had succeeded Albert Soboul two years earlier. He obtained the agrégation in history in 1986 and subsequently taught at the Lycée Faidherbe in Lille and the Lycée international de Saint-Germain-en-Laye. He later worked at the University of Catania in Sicily as a lecturer and linguistic attaché for cultural events at the French Embassy in Italy.

Serna devoted his doctoral thesis to the lesser-known revolutionary aristocrat Pierre-Antoine Antonelle. In 1998, following the publication of his thesis, he was awarded the Grand History Prize of the General Council of Bouches-du-Rhône by a jury chaired by historians Maurice Agulhon and Robert-Henri Bautier.

He was a lecturer in modern history at the University of Reims Champagne-Ardenne from 1995 to 1998 before returning to Paris I at the start of the 1999 academic year. In 2008, he became a university professor and took charge of the Institute for the History of the French Revolution. He was the tenth professor in the chair since Alphonse Aulard and its seventh director since its foundation by Georges Lefebvre and Jean Zay in 1937. He held this position until 2015, when the institute was integrated into the Institute of Modern and Contemporary History (IHMC).

Since October 1, 2019, he has been a member of the Institut Universitaire de France.

He directs the online journal La Révolution française.

He has served as the vice-president of the International Commission for the History of the French Revolution since 2010.

He is also the scientific director for the digitization of the Parliamentary Archives, a project conducted in collaboration with Persée, the Bibliothèque de la Sorbonne, and the Institute for the History of the French Revolution.

In 2025, Serna was suspended from teaching and research for one year following a decision by the disciplinary board of Paris 1 Panthéon-Sorbonne University over allegations of psychological harassment.

== Political and editorial commitments ==
As a member of the Comité de vigilance face aux usages publics de l'histoire and in his role as scientific manager at the Institute for the History of the French Revolution, Serna is actively involved in debates surrounding history education and the uses of the past in the contemporary public sphere, particularly within political discourse.

In early 2011, he published several articles regarding the Tunisian Revolution and the Egyptian revolution of 2011. He notably criticized analyses by other historians who drew direct parallels to the events of 1789 in the columns of Le Monde.

In 2015, he co-signed an article in Le Monde protesting what the signatories termed "lies and fantasies" reported by the media regarding new middle school history curricula.

In 2017, he co-signed an op-ed in Mediapart titled "Faire gagner la gauche passe par le vote Mélenchon" ("Winning the Left Requires Voting for Mélenchon").

From May 2017, Serna authored a weekly column, "Ma chronique de l'extrême centre" (My Column on the Extreme Center), which appeared in the Friday edition of l'Humanité.

== Administrative suspension and harassment allegations ==
In June 2025, Serna was suspended from teaching and research until June 2, 2026, by the University of Paris 1 Panthéon-Sorbonne. This decision followed an internal institutional dispute within his research laboratory linked to his efforts to defend the independence and structural preservation of the IHRF, which was originally established in 1937 by the Popular Front. Serna has consistently denied the allegations of psychological harassment brought against him by the university's administrative commission, challenging their refusal to accept his formal defense submissions. While the university maintained its disciplinary suspension regarding his core institutional roles, it allowed him to continue supervising his existing doctoral students, noting that the ongoing restrictions stem strictly from internal administrative conflicts.
