= Louis Marie Sicard =

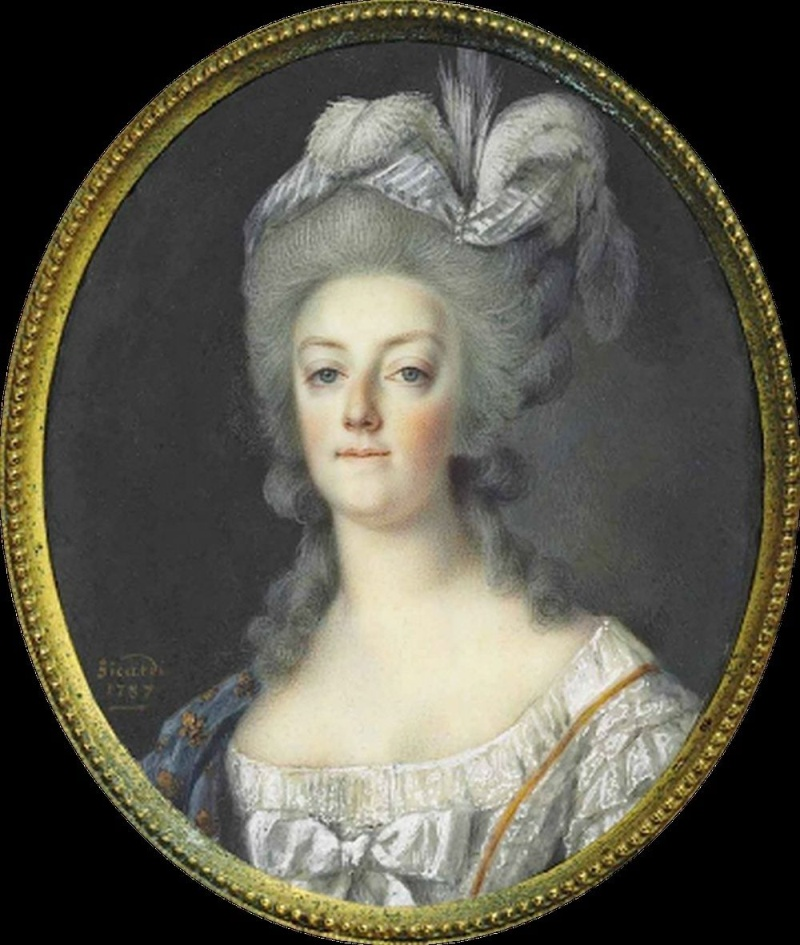
Marie-Antoinette (1782)

Louis Marie Sicard, or Sicardi (2 August 1743, Avignon – 18 July 1825, Paris) was a French portrait miniaturist.

== Biography ==
He was born to the painter Jean-Pierre Antoine Sicard, originally from Toulouse, and his wife, Marie-Anne née Scudier. His studies were primarily with his father.

In 1769, he presented himself at the "Académie des beaux arts de Bordeaux". He used the name "Sicardi" and claimed to be of Italian origin; believable because, at that time, Avignon was still a papal domain. He became a member and a professor there in 1771. Shortly after, he married Anne Rouzier and they had a daughter. Two years later he left suddenly, for unknown reasons, and went to Paris. As late as 1780, the Académie was still seeking a replacement. Anne died there, at an unknown date. He remarried in 1781, to Marie-Alexandrine Jobelin (1757–1835), the daughter of a government lawyer. They had no children.

His works brought him to the attention of the Maison du Roi and he was commissioned to create several paintings. In 1782, he presented the Maison with two portraits of King Louis XVI and one of Marie-Antoinette. In 1783, letters were exchanged regarding his return to Bordeaux, but their offers were rejected. He would create five portraits of the King altogether. Until the Revolution, all of his portraits were of the royal family and their courtiers.

When the Revolution began, he went to London and announced his arrival in a letter to Dominic Serres, painter to the King of England. Despite this, he seems to have produced very little work. By 1791, he and Marie were back in Paris. That same year, the Salon eliminated its requirement that exhibitors be members of the Académie de Peinture, and he presented a small painting of Mirabeau. He continued to present works of a popular nature for many years. In 1796, he wrote to Serres that he had used up all of his wealth and was "obliged to work to earn a living".

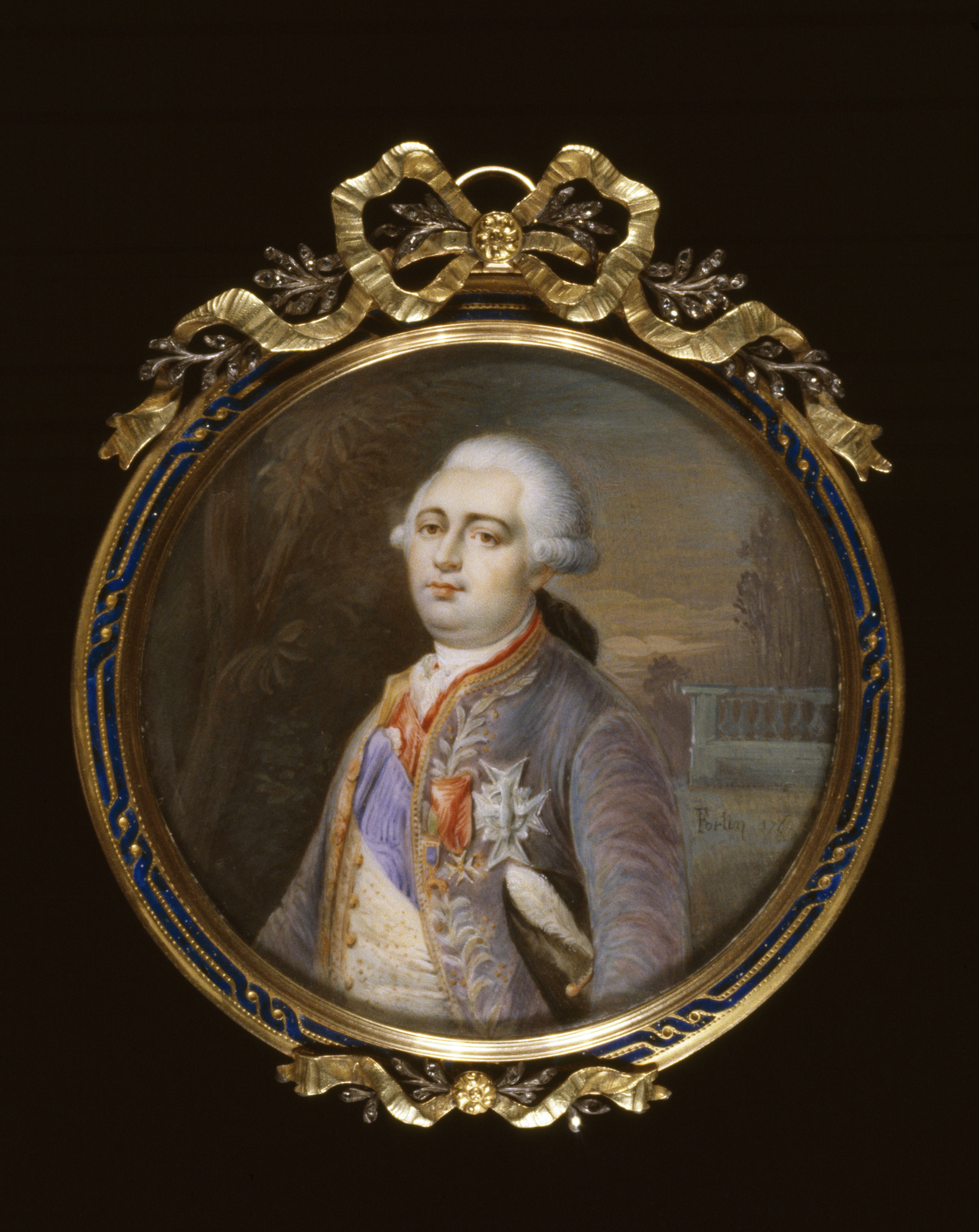
King Louis XVI (1782/89)

In 1799, he was proposed for membership in the Institut de France, but was number eleven on a list from which ten members were chosen. In 1801, he reestablished his relationship with the ruling elite when General Paul Thiébault commissioned a portrait miniature of his father, Dieudonné Thiébault, which gained the admiration of Joséphine Bonaparte.

Five months after the Bourbon Restoration in 1814, he was made a Knight in the Legion of Honor and named Painter to the King's Cabinet. His final exhibit at the Salon came in 1819. He died at his home in 1825, at age 81.
