= École centrale =

The écoles centrales (literally central schools) were schools set up in 1795 during the French Revolution to replace the college of art faculties in France's historic universities. The idea for them came from the Committee of Public Instruction and their main instigators were Joseph Lakanal and Pierre Daunou, though Jean Henri Bancal des Issarts came up with the name for them. One work on their history states:

The republican government also engaged itself in an education policy that sought to replace the colleges of the Ancien Régime with establishments giving a scientific education, in which experimental physics and chemistry was part of the curriculum and was provided by professors with official status. It thus created the "Écoles Centrales" – these may have been short-lived, but they at least marked a break with the educational system that had previously predominated.

They were suppressed in 1802.

== History ==
=== Decrees ===
==== 7 ventôse year III ====
The écoles centrales were secondary schools created in Nicolas de Condorcet's plan for public instruction. The general plan presented by Condorcet was presented on 30 January 1792, with draft of the decree before the Committee of Public Instruction. The report and draft of the decree were read before the Assembly on 20–21 April 1792. It proposed five levels of instruction:

- Primary schools;
- Secondary schools;
- Instituts (collèges);
- Lycées;
- The National Society of Arts and Sciences, charged with the general direction of education and the teaching of educators. To Condorcet, the creation of an autonomous society allowed the guarantee of teaching of educates independent of royal power.

From Condorcet's plan, Jean Henri Bancal des Issarts proposed in 1792 to remove the first level of schools, the primary schools, and the highest level, the lycées. He wanted the schools at the intermediate levels not to be financed by the state. Additionally, instead of the nine lycées proposed by Condorcet for all of France, he asked for the creation of a lycée for each department and gave them the name "écoles centrales".

The Committee of Public Instruction reviewed Bancal des Issarts proposition after 9 Thermidor but including the "instituts" asked for by Condorcet. On 26 Frimaire an III, Joseph Lakanal set out in a report the curriculum for these central schools: physics, chemistry, anatomy, natural history, belles-lettres, ancient languages, modern languages, law, agriculture, commerce, arts and crafts, mathematics and drawing.

==== 3 brumaire year IV ====
Écoles centrales were created by a decree of 25 February 1795, subsequently modified by Title II of the Daunou law of 3 Brumaire year IV (25 October 1795) on the organization of public education.

The first article provides for one school per French department but articles 10 to 12 authorize the establishment of "écoles centrales secondaires" for towns that are not departmental capitals and already have a collège, on the condition that the establishment is financed by the commune.

Education is divided into three sections (art. 2), each lasting two years, since students are admitted to the first at age 12, the second at 14 and the third at 16 (art. 3). Each of these sections corresponds to a certain number of disciplines. For the first, the curriculum included drawing, natural history, ancient languages and, in certain cases and with government authorization, modern languages. The second section was purely scientific, with mathematics, as well as experimental physics and chemistry. Finally, the third teaching section included grammar, literature, history and law.

The teachers of these schools were to be chosen by a "jury d'instruction" (art. 5). If necessary, they could be dismissed at the jury's discretion, but the board was to give its approval for any dismissal (art. 6). Their fixed salary was that of a department administrator (art. 7), but they received a share of the school fees paid by families, up to a maximum of 25 livres per year (art. 8).

Article 4 required each école centrale to have a public library, a garden, a natural history exhibit and science laboratory.

=== Establishment ===
Écoles centrales were put into place little by little. In many cities, the site of the old collège were reused for the école. To establish a library, administrations grouped together district libraries.

In 1802, there was an école central in the following ninety-five towns: Agen, Aix, Ajaccio, Alby, Alençon, Amiens, Angoulême (now lycée Guez-de-Balzac), Angers, Anvers, Arras, Aubusson, Auch, Autun, Auxerre, Avranches, Bayeux, Beauvais, Besançon, Bordeaux, Bourg, Bourges, Bruge, Bruxelles, Caen, Cahors, Carcassonne, Carpentras, Chalons, Chambéry, Charleville, Chartres, Chateauroux, Chaumont, Clermont-Ferrant, Colmar, Cologne, Dijon, Dole, Epinal, Évreux, Fontainebleau, Gand, Gap, Grenoble, Laval, Le Puy, Liege, Lille, Limoges, Luçon (now Lycée Atlantique), Luxembourg, Lyon, Maestricht, Mans, Mayence, Mende, Metz, Montélimart, Mons, Montpellier, Moulins, Namur, Nancy, Nantes, Nevers, Nice, Niort, Nîmes, Pau, Périgeux, Perpignan, Poitiers, Quimper, Rennes, Rhodez, Roanne, Rouen, Saint-Brieuc, Saint-Flour, Saint-Girons, Saint-Severtes, Saintes, Soissons, Strasbourg, Tarbes, Toulon, Toulouse, Tournon, Tours, Troyes, Tulle, Vannes, Verdun, Versailles, Vesoul.

In Paris, it was planned that five central schools would be established to reflect the size of the population. In fact, only three were created:

- The école centrale of Panthéon (future lycée Henri-IV), established in the former abbey of Sainte-Geneviève;
- The école centrale of Quatre-Nations established in the former collège des Quatre Nations (future location of the Institut de France), then in the former collège du Plessis;
- The école centrale of rue Saint-Antoine (future lycée Charlemagne) established in the former maison professe de Paris.

The Lycée de la Chaussée-d'Antin, now the Lycée Condorcet, was founded in 1803 on the site of the couvent des Capucins built by Brongniart in 1780–1783.

=== End ===
These écoles centrales were criticized, notably in an inquiry launched in 1801 by Interior Minister Jean-Antoine Chaptal. The main criticisms expressed were poor coordination with primary schooling, lack of moral and religious education, and excessive freedom given to pupils. Above all, the central schools seemed perhaps too revolutionary for the taste of the new Bonapartist regime.

The law of 11 floréal year X (1 May 1802) abolished the écoles entrales and replaced them, for the most important ones, by lycées maintained by the state and for the others, by secondary schools or colleges, financed by the communes or privately (i.e. by families).

The libraries of the central schools were given to the communes by a decision of 28 January 1803. The holdings of these libraries often form part of the older documents of the bibliothèques municipales classées.

== Bibliography (in French) ==
- J. Guillaume, Procès-verbaux du Comité d'instruction publique de la Convention Nationale, tome 5, 17 fructidor an II (3 septempre 1794) – 30 ventôse an III (20 mars 1795), p. 537–575, Imrimerie nationale, Paris, 1804 (online)
- Antoine Léon, Pierre Roche, Histoire de l'enseignement en France, Presses Universitaires de France (collection Que sais-je ? no. 393), Paris, 2012 ISBN 978-2-13059179-5 ; p. 128
- Antoine-Louis-Claude Destutt de Tracy, Projet d'éléments d'idéologie à l'usage des écoles centrales de la République française, chez Pierre Didot l'aîné, Firmin Didot et Debray, Paris, an IX (online)
- Antoine-Louis-Claude Destutt de Tracy, Œuvres complètes tome 1, présentées par Claude Jolly : Premiers écrits – Sur l'éducation et l'instruction publique, Librairie philosophique J. Vrin, Paris, 2011 ISBN 978-2-7116-2133-0
- Sylvestre-François Lacroix, Discours sur l'instruction publique, prononcé à la distribution des prix des écoles centrales du département de la Seine, 29 thermidor an VIII ; suivi de notes sur l'état actuel et le régime des écoles centrales, Duprat, Paris, an VIII
- Élisabeth Liris, De l’Abbaye Sainte-Geneviève au Lycée Napoléon : l’École centrale du Panthéon (1796–1804), La Révolution française, cahiers de l'Institut d'histoire de la Révolution française, 2013, no. 4 (Pédagogies, utopies et révolutions (1789–1848)) (online)
- Enseignement républicain et innovation pédagogique : L’École centrale de l’Eure (1795–1804)
