= Pierre-Antoine Guéroult =

French scholar

Pierre-Remy-Antoine-Guillaume Guéroult, called "Guéroult jeune" (Young Guéroult), (16 January 1749 in Rouen – 14 December 1816) was an 18th–19th-century French scholar.

The year he died he was made a chevalier of the Légion d'honneur by King Louis XVIII.

== Works ==
- 1790: Origine de la république une et indivisible, drama which he offered in homage to the National Constituent Assembly.
- 1802: Dictionnaire de la France monarchique, ou la France telle qu’elle était en janvier 1789; in-8°;
- 1783–1789: t.VIII de la traduction des œuvres de Cicero (with his brother Guéroult aîné). This translation was directed by Jean-Marie-Bernard Clément and Jean-Nicolas Démeunier, 8 vol. in-12, ou 3 vol. 4°. The volume by the Guéroult brothers includes the Harangue sur les réponses des aruspices, that pour Sextus, the Plaidoyers pour Plancius et pour Celius, and the Invective contre Vatinius;
- 1794: Constitution des Spartiates, des Athéniens et des Romains, in-8°. He left manuscripts of the translation of several Discours by Cicero and one opera, Étéocle et Polynice, non presented.

== Sources ==
- Théodore-Éloi Lebreton, Biographie normande, t. 2, Rouen, Le Brument, 1858, p. 185-6.
