= Jean-Marie Ragon =

French freemason, author and editor

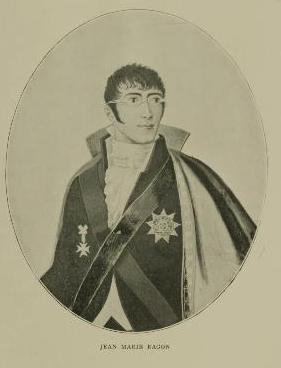
Jean-Marie Ragon

Jean-Marie Ragon de Bettignies (born 25 February 1781 at Bray-sur-Seine, died 1862 at Bruges) was a French Freemason, author and editor.

== Biography ==
Jean-Marie Ragon was born at Bray-sur-Seine. His father worked as a notary. He was initiated into Freemasonry in 1804 at Bruges where his duties as paymaster in the imperial administration had led him. He worked as a member of a team charged with the critical examination of dictionaries for the Journal Grammatical and published a method of reading. He was also the editor of the first French Masonic revue, Hermes.

== Masonic career ==
Jean-Marie Ragon was initiated into the lodge Les amis du Nord at Bruges, which at that time was administered as a department of France. He likewise belonged to the lodge Le Phœnix of the Grand Orient de France and to the Rite of Memphis-Misraim, as well as to the Order of the Temple of Bernard-Raymond Fabré-Palaprat. He founded and presided over the celebrated Parisian lodge Les Vrais Amis, which later became Les Trinosophes, which enjoyed, thanks to him, a certain renown. He occupied the post of Worshipful Master of this lodge for many years, from 1817 onwards.

According to Kenneth R. H. Mackenzie, the editor of The Royal Masonic Cyclopaedia, Ragon "laboured hard to distinguish between the actual history of various Masonic societies and that vague traditional history which to so great an extent refutes itself." Mackenzie also asserted that Ragon "supported the idea that Elias Ashmole was the main founder of Freemasonry in its present form."

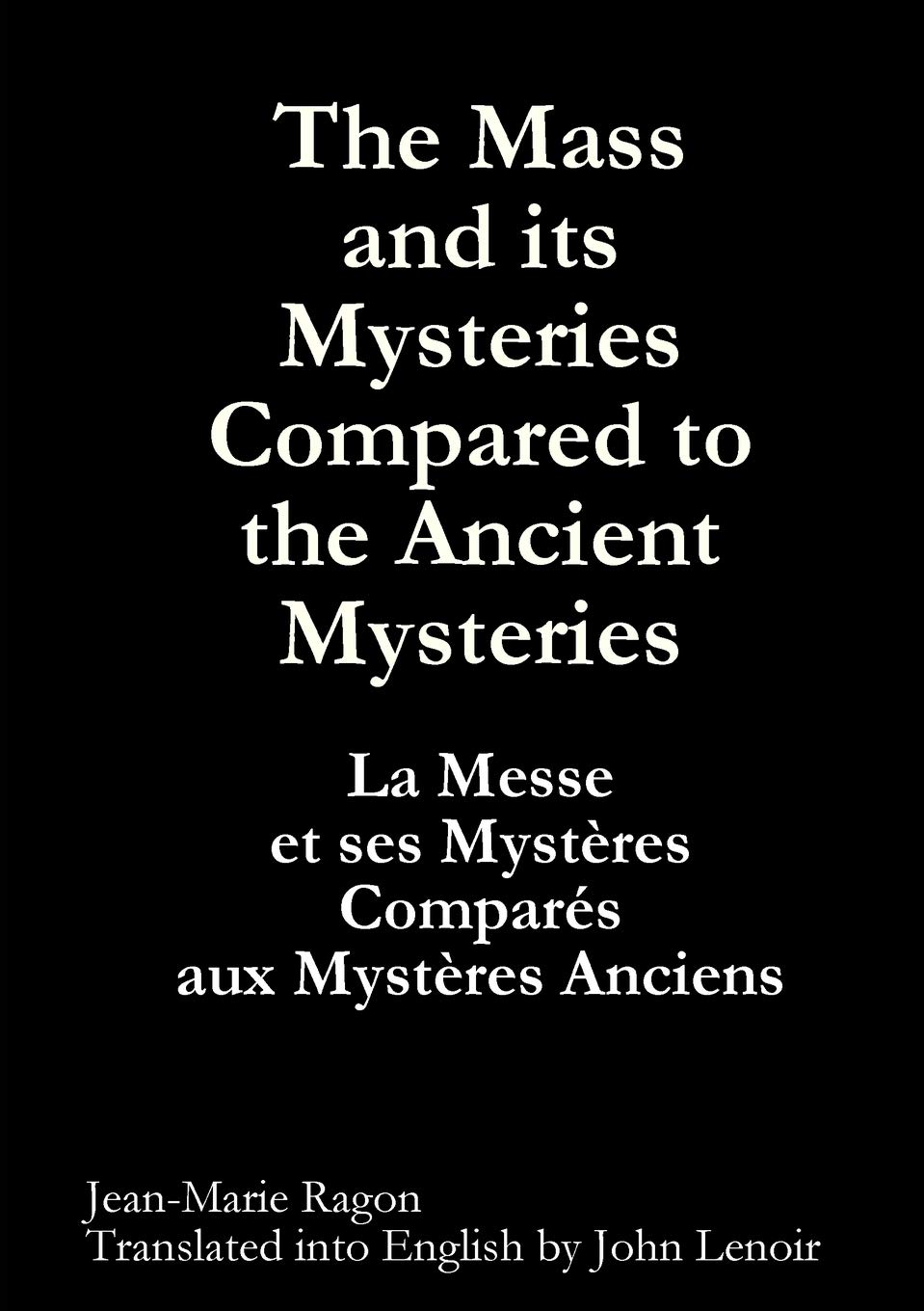
The Mass and its Mysteries Compared to the Ancient Mysteries

== Literary works ==
He was the author of a number of widely influential Masonic works :

- Cours philosophique et interprétatif des initiations anciennes et modernes (1840) (available on Gallica);
- De la maçonnerie occulte et de l'initiation hermétique (1853), Maison de vie publisher, 2009, 171 p.;
- Rituel d'Apprenti (1859), Éditions du Prieuré, 1992, 108 p.;
- Rituel de Compagnon (1859), Éditions du Prieuré, 1992, 69 p.;
- Rituel du Maître (1859), Éditions du Prieuré, 1992, 80 p.;
- Orthodoxie maçonnique (1853), Cercle des amis de la Bibliothèque initiatique, 1972, 414 p.;
- Rituel d'une pompe funèbre maçonnique, Equinoxis, 2014, 21 p.;
- Rituel de la maçonnerie forestière (1860), Editions du Prieuré, 1993, 48 p.;
- Perhaps Le Livre rouge, Lavigne, 1842, 144 p.
- La Messe et ses mystères comparés aux mystères anciens, ou Complément de la science initiatique, 1844, 468 p.;
- Edition : Paris : Éd. Télètes, 2000 Tuileur general de la Franc-Maçonnerie,;
- Notice Historique sur le Calendrier, 1842, 48 p.
