= Parnes, Oise =

Parnes
- Commune
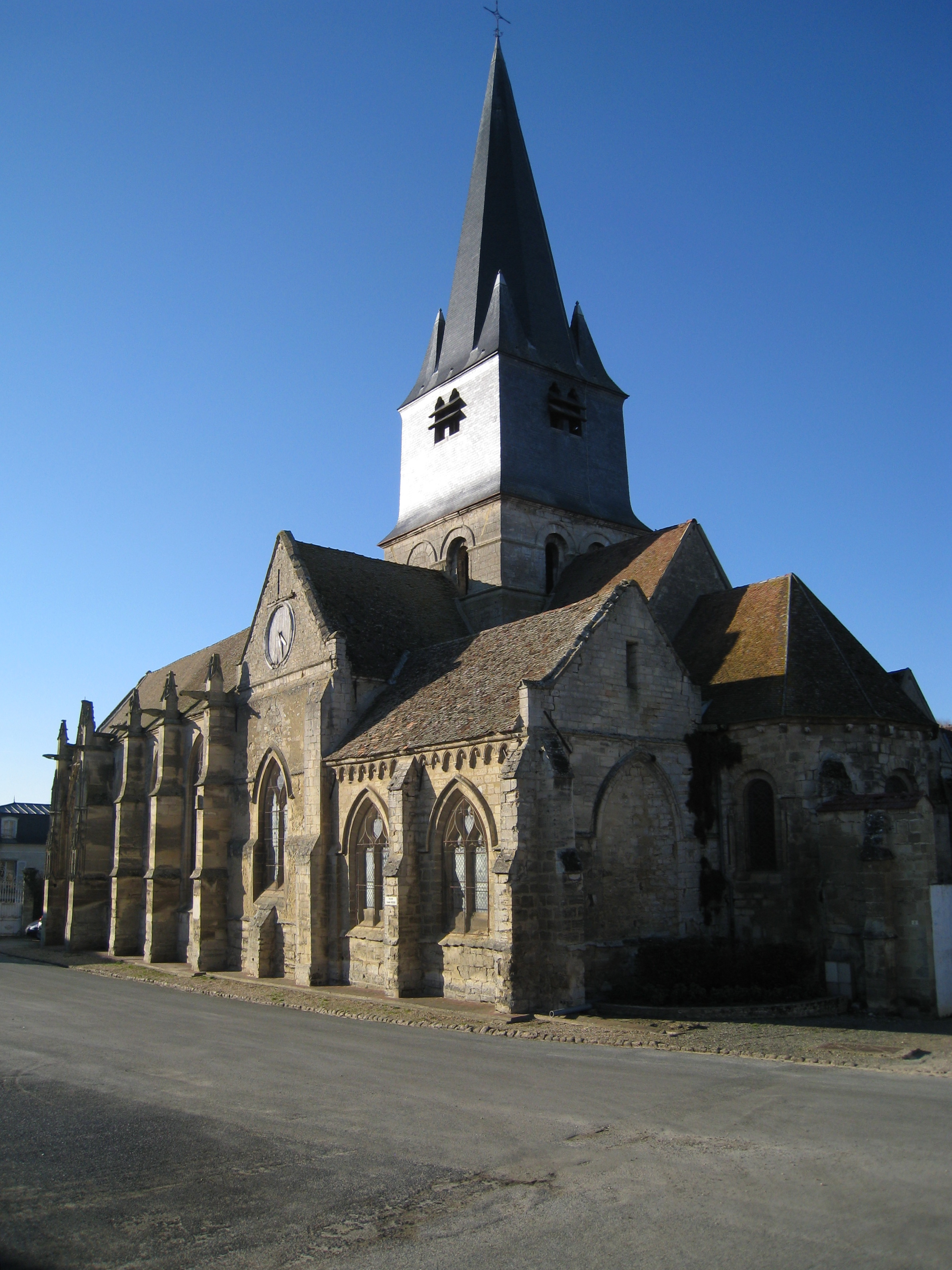
- The church in Parnes
- Location of Parnes
- Location within France Location within Hauts-de-France
- Coordinates: 49°12′14″N 1°44′19″E
- Country: France
- Region: Hauts-de-France
- Department: Oise
- Arrondissement: Beauvais
- Canton: Chaumont-en-Vexin
- Intercommunality: Vexin Thelle

Government
  - Mayor (2020–2026): Pascal Laroche
- Area^{1}: 12.43 km^{2} (4.80 sq mi)
- Elevation: 138 m (453 ft)
- Highest elevation: 148 m (486 ft)
- Lowest elevation: 64 m (210 ft)
- Population (2023): 313
  - Density: 25.2/km^{2} (65.2/sq mi)
- Time zone: UTC+01:00 (CET)
  - Summer (DST): UTC+02:00 (CEST)
- INSEE/Postal code: 60487 /60240
- ^{1} French Land Register data, which excludes lakes, ponds, glaciers > 1 km^{2} (0.386 sq mi or 247 acres) and river estuaries.

Parnes (French pronunciation: [paʁn]) is a commune in the Oise department in northern France. The 12th-15th century church of Saint-Josse is a historical monument.

== See also ==
- Communes of the Oise department
