= Committee of Public Instruction =

The Committee of Public Instruction (French: Comité de l'Instruction Publique), often called the Committee of Public Education, was established in 1791 by the Legislative Assembly in an attempt to reorder the education system in France. The Committee of Public Instruction continued to exist under the National Convention, with new elections in 1792 and remained for many years, radically changing form over time. In July 1793, Maximilien Robespierre created a Commission of Public Instruction as a subsidiary to the Committee of Public Safety. Though in discussions concerning the French Revolution, other aspects are often given precedence, the French educational system experienced serious reforms throughout the time period. Leaders of the Revolution, placed great emphasis on the future of French education. The Committee of Public Instruction served crucial in removing the Catholic Church from the educational system. In the same year as its inception, the committee ordered all districts across France to seize land, edifices, furniture, scientific instruments, art collections, and libraries belonging to religious establishments. The Committee of Public Instruction focused on such education issues as, "the duties and prerogatives of the state, the rights of parents, the potential benefits of higher education, the economic needs of the nation, the necessity for training teachers, and the suitable status of the teaching profession in a republic." The committee included prominent figures such as, Lazare Carnot, a renowned French politician, engineer, and mathematician who wrote many educational reforms on behalf of the board. This Committee failed to radically improve French education as a whole.

== Origins and evolution ==
=== Dechristianization ===
Once established in 1793, the Committee of Public Education first approached the matter of religion. Throughout the nation, revolutionaries were rejecting and destroying many of the powerful old orders. The Catholic Church in particular was a dominant pre-revolution power. The Church controlled primary and secondary education throughout France. Prior to the revolution, France’s century-old Church-run educational system provided classical schooling to around 50,000 young men. Recognizing the importance of eliminating the Church’s power over education, the Committee of Public Instruction scrapped the entire system. They seized Church held properties, terminated priests and school teachers, and began recreating and reorganizing French education. Through new policies and anti-catholic propaganda, this Committee successfully lessened the power of the Catholic Church in matters of education.

=== Advancements in education ===
Throughout the Reign of Terror, methods to improve the French education system were often discussed but were not implemented. For example, Nicolas de Condorcet, a renowned French philosopher and political scientist, drew up an extensive plan for universal French education that was not adopted due to costly military operations abroad. The mass executions and political tension common from September 1793 to July 1794 clearly proved a distraction to the Committee of Public Instruction. It took the execution of Maximilian Robespierre, one of the most influential figures of the French Revolution, and the subsequent end of the Reign of Terror to bring enough relative internal peace to allow for substantial educational reform. Secondary schools were eventually set up in the large urban metropolises attracting young men throughout France. Where the old schooling system emphasized religious virtues, this new and expanded system promoted the modern sciences and the preparation of young men for the "new regime". However, the entirety of education still remained off-limits to females. Originally, teacher salaries were set by the national government and strictly regulated, demonstrating the importance placed upon education.

The emphasis placed on education during the French Revolution allowed for the general improvement of schooling throughout France, as well as enforced linguistical conformity in an attempt to eradicate patois or local dialects of French. Many aspects of educational reform through the Committee of Public Instruction were successful, yet, overall the schooling system remained quite weak.

== Members ==
- Louis François Antoine Arbogast
- Jean-François Barailon
- Léonard Bourdon
- Marie-Joseph Chénier
- Nicolas de Condorcet
- Pierre Daunou
- Jacques-Louis David
- Fabre d'Églantine
- l'abbé Henri Grégoire
- Louis-Bernard Guyton-Morveau
- Joseph Lakanal
- François Xavier Lanthenas
- Louis-Sébastien Mercier
- René-François Plaichard Choltière
- Gilbert Romme
- Emmanuel-Joseph Sieyès
- Antoine Claire Thibaudeau
- Noël-Gabriel-Luce Villar

== See also ==
- Committee of Public Safety
- Maximilien Robespierre
- National Assembly
- History of education in France
- Reign of Terror
