= The Origin of All Religious Worship =

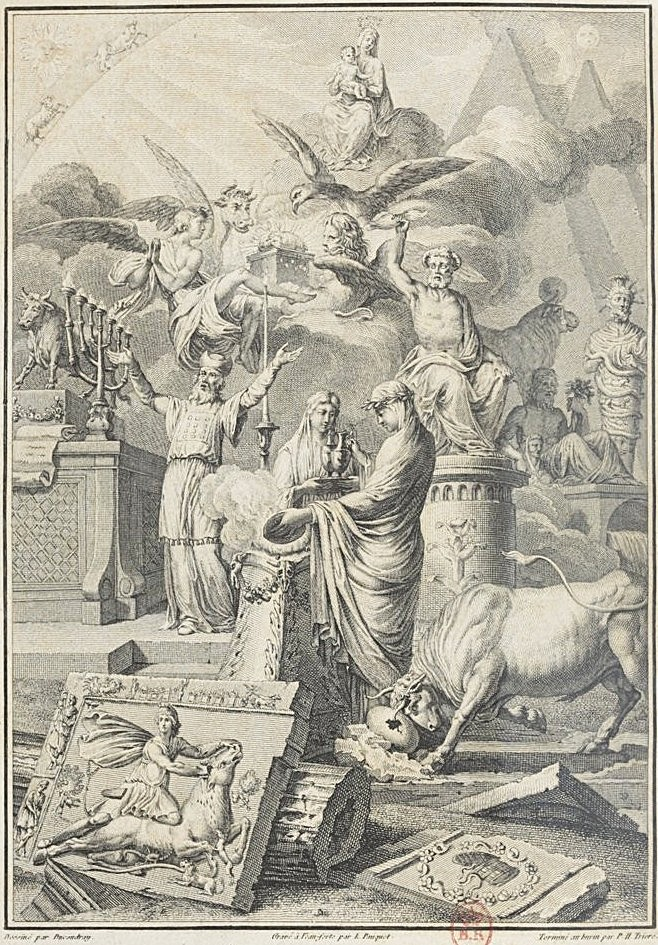
- Frontispiece of The Origin of All Religious Worship, after a drawing by Moreau the Younger.
- Original title: Origine de tous les cultes, ou Religion universelle
- Language: French
- Subject: Religious studies, comparative mythology
- Publisher: Henri Agasse
- Publication date: 1795
- Publication place: Paris

The Origin of All Religious Worship, or Universal Religion is a book by Charles-François Dupuis, first published in 1795.

Comparing traditions, primarily those of the Hellenistic world, Dupuis sought to demonstrate that all ancient religions were fundamentally based on the worship of nature and its cycles. He argued that the gods and mythological heroes symbolized the succession of the seasons, the opposition between light and darkness, and the movements of the Sun, the Moon, and the planets through the constellations.

He examines the myths of Osiris and Isis, Hercules, Bacchus, and the Argonauts, before applying the same interpretative framework to Christianity. The life of Jesus, whose historical existence Dupuis questioned – making him one of the earliest proponents of the Christ myth theory –, is presented as a "solar fable": the Lamb of God was born of the Virgo on the feast of Sol Invictus, was followed by the Twelve Apostles, and rose again after the spring equinox.

This monumental work of scholarship – three volumes totalling some two thousand pages, accompanied by an illustrated atlas intended to guide the reader – was followed in 1798 by an abridged edition.

Both the original work and its abridgement were placed on the Index of Forbidden Books by the Catholic Church in 1818.

== Context ==
=== The Enlightenment ===
In his posthumously published work The Chronology of Ancient Kingdoms Amended (1728), Isaac Newton employed the precession of the equinoxes to date the expedition of the Argonauts, which he placed in the tenth century BC. (Note: Newton was trying to reconcile universal history with the biblical narrative. His conclusions, later adopted in France by Voltaire, were criticized by Nicolas Fréret, who emphasized the incompatibility between Christian chronology and those of other civilizations.)

During the eighteenth century, two principal interpretations of mythology coexisted. The first was euhemerism, according to which the gods had originally been historical figures who were later deified. In France, this approach was notably developed by Étienne Fourmont and Abbé Banier. The second was the allegorical interpretation, which held that the heavenly bodies and natural phenomena had originally been personified and worshipped as deities. Among the principal advocates of allegorical interpretation in eighteenth-century Britain were the Anglican bishop William Warburton (The Divine Legation of Moses, 1739–1761) and Thomas Blackwell (Letters Concerning Mythology, 1748).

In his Histoire du ciel (1739), Abbé Pluche argued that "it was astronomy that invented the names, attributes, and figures which greed and ignorance transformed into so many powers worthy of reverence or fear." Pluche traced the invention of the zodiac back to the time of the Tower of Babel, before the dispersion of the descendants of Noah. (Note: In 1740, the Jesuit Father Le Mire replied to Pluche in the Journal de Trévoux. He argued that the zodiac had been invented in Greece when the constellation Aries coincided with the spring equinox, around 400 BC. In his view, this was the only plausible date, since following the cycle of the precession of the equinoxes would otherwise require going back some 25,000 years for Aries once again to coincide with the beginning of spring – a conclusion incompatible with biblical chronology.) Nicolas Antoine Boulanger, in L'Antiquité dévoilée (1766), likewise advanced the idea that the worship of the heavenly bodies was common to all peoples and dated back to the Flood.

Between 1773 and 1782, the Protestant pastor and physiocrat Antoine Court de Gébelin published Le Monde primitif, an influential work that sought to reconstruct the history of humanity through a comparative study of langages – he was searching for the Adamic language – mythologies, and symbolic systems. His method relied on allegorical interpretation: myths, devoid of any historical foundation, had served primarily to illustrate the agricultural calendar.

Charles-François Dupuis, then professor of rhetoric in Paris, attended the astronomy lectures of Jérôme Lalande at the Collège Royal (Note: Dupuis first presented these ideas to Lalande during one of his lectures at the Collège Royal on 18 May 1778.) when he conceived an interpretation comparable to that of Court de Gébelin: myths, understood as vehicles for transmitting an archaic natural science, expressed correspondences between celestial and terrestrial phenomena.

With the support of Jérôme Lalande (Note: Lalande presented Dupuis's theories to the Académie des sciences in November 1780.) – the founder of the Masonic lodge of the Nine Sisters, of which Court de Gébelin was also a member – Dupuis published four letters in the Journal des savants between June 1779 and February 1780. His Memoir on the Origin of the Constellations and the Explanation of Myth through Astronomy was incorporated by Lalande into the fourth volume of his Treatise on Astronomy in 1781. Dupuis announced that he was preparing "a considerable work."

Under the Ancien Régime, in order to avoid censorship, Dupuis carefully refrained from attacking Christianity directly. His third letter to the Journal des savants (February 1780), devoted to Hercules, concluded with an allusive passage:

I leave it to my readers to draw the consequences. Is this the only instance in which mankind has been mistaken? I could… But the light of truth is like that of the sun: it must be presented to mankind only by degrees, and one must wait until a long twilight has prepared their eyes to bear its brilliance.

Referring to this cryptic passage fifteen years later, Dupuis wrote:

I had already hinted at the fable of the Christians' Sun-God, which I had already discovered, and which only the Revolution made it possible for me to develop in print in France.

Despite his caution, these articles earned Dupuis a reputation as an unbeliever. After several unsuccessful candidacies for the Académie des Inscriptions et Belles-Lettres, he considered settling in Berlin, where Frederick the Great had invited him on the recommendation of the Marquis de Condorcet. On the eve of the French Revolution, however, Dupuis was appointed professor at the Collège Royal and elected to the Académie des Inscriptions et Belles-Lettres.

In 1788, Lalande published in the Journal des savants an interpretation by Dupuis of the Portal of the Virgin at Notre-Dame de Paris. The Virgin, depicted at the centre of the zodiac, was identified with Isis, while Christ was implicitly equated with Horus:

She holds in her arms the god of light under the emblem of a newborn child, just as the ancients represented the Sun at the winter solstice, for at that season they gave it the form of an infant […].

=== A Delayed Publication ===
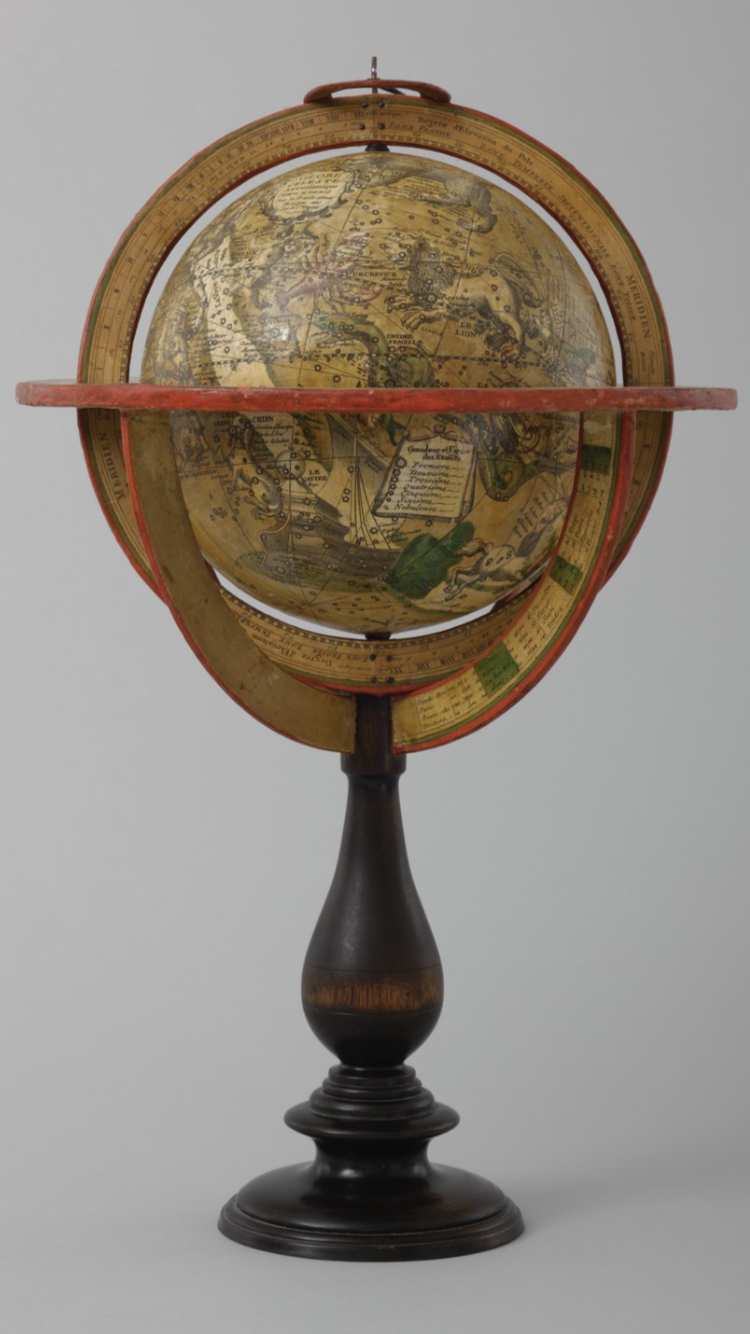
Astronomical, Poetic, and Universal Celestial Globe for the Great Year of 25,920 Years, preserved in the Bibliothèque nationale de France. The precession of the equinoxes lies at the heart of Dupuis's hermeneutic system.

In March 1792, the publisher Charles-Joseph Panckoucke acquired the rights to Dupuis's "great work", then still in preparation. Dupuis was elected to the National Convention in September and took part in the creation of the French Republican calendar. Printing of The Origin of All Religious Worship began in the spring of 1793 but was interrupted during the Reign of Terror, as the publisher gave priority to the Encyclopédie méthodique because of shortages of paper and labour. In January 1794, Panckoucke transferred his publishing house to his son-in-law, Henri Agasse.

Antoine Letellier, a friend and collaborator of Dupuis, was sentenced to death by the Revolutionary Tribunal in June 1794 because of his Girondin sympathies. Dupuis himself, aware that his correspondence was under surveillance, feared that he too might be sent to the guillotine. (Note: He entrusted his manuscripts to Loysel, the craftsman who made his astronomical globes.)

Printing resumed under the Thermidorian Convention. On 7 September 1795, following the adoption of the Constitution of Year III, Dupuis presented the first copy of The Origin of All Religious Worship to the deputies. The following day, the work went on sale in a three-volume quarto edition accompanied by an illustrated atlas, priced at 600 livres (3,000 livres for the wove-paper edition). A twelve-volume octavo edition appeared shortly thereafter.

Readers could also purchase, from Citizen Loysel in the Sorbonne district, a special celestial globe constructed according to Dupuis's instructions.

== Summary ==
=== Book I ===
Although the work bears the subtitle "Universal Religion", Dupuis states from the outset that he writes as a historian and does not intend to found a new religion. (Note: "The sole purpose of this work is to trace our religious opinions back to their source, to determine their origin, to follow their development and their various forms, to reveal the common chain that unites them all, and to propose a general method for analysing their monstrous and shapeless mass. I shall not speak of revealed religions, because none exist, nor can any exist. All are daughters of curiosity, ignorance, self-interest, and imposture. In my view, the gods are the children of men; and I think, with Hesiod, that the Earth gave birth to Heaven.") As a citizen, he declares himself willing to submit to any collective belief that strengthens morality and legislation. His criticism of Christianity is therefore not intended to undermine the social order but, he argues, to establish it on reason rather than superstition.

Dupuis defines God as "the universal cause and active power that organizes all beings that have a beginning and an end – that is, the principle of all things, itself without any other principle." God is therefore identified with Nature – the Deus sive Natura of Spinoza – which has always presented itself to humanity as an all-encompassing reality, concealed in its essence but manifest through its effects. (Note: "After many centuries of philosophy, the Egyptians found themselves compelled to engrave upon one of the temples of Nature that celebrated inscription: 'I am all that is, all that has been, and all that shall be, and no mortal has yet lifted the veil that covers me.' How many centuries it has taken mankind to return to this point [...].") The search for causes, he argues, should therefore stop at the threshold of metaphysics. Dupuis cites Ocellus and Pliny the Elder to show that divinity was conceived as inseparable from Nature.

A passage from the Pentateuch (Deuteronomy 4:19), in which Moses warns his people against worshipping images, the Sun, the Moon, and the stars, demonstrates, according to Dupuis, the original primacy of pantheism: only practices that actually exist need to be prohibited. He also cites in this connection a passage from the Book of Wisdom (13:1–9), traditionally attributed to King Solomon. Abraham, he argues, had himself been born into the religion of Nature, as maintained by Philo and Maimonides.

Originally, divinity was inseparable from the spectacle of the cosmos, and the vault of heaven served as humanity's universal sanctuary. With the advent of sedentism, religious buildings appeared. Their function was to inscribe the laws of time into space: their proportions, orientations, and internal divisions reflected the movements of the heavens. (Note: According to Pliny the Elder, obelisks and pyramids were dedicated to the Sun, and their inscriptions contained the interpretation of the mysteries of Nature. Dupuis also cites Ammianus Marcellinus, Tertullian, and Cornelius de Pauw, who regarded the pyramids as markers of the equinoxes. Egypt was said to have been the intellectual centre of "Sabaism"; its monuments, hieroglyphs, and sanctuaries formed a complete symbolic system expressing the worship of Nature. Dupuis adopted Athanasius Kircher's view that the worship of the heavenly bodies had spread throughout the ancient world from Egypt. In India, Persia, China, Japan, Peru, and elsewhere, the architecture of sacred buildings was said to follow astronomical principles. Celestial divisions into seven (the planets) and twelve (the zodiacal signs) recur frequently. Number itself constituted the key – a point later echoed by Giorgio de Santillana in the twentieth century. Dupuis also drew attention to multiples of twelve (72, 108, 432), which he believed structured myths and monuments as far afield as China.)

Dupuis seeks to demonstrate that the worship of the heavenly bodies predominated throughout much of the ancient world. He marshals testimony concerning the ancient Egyptians from Diodorus Siculus, Lucian, Chaeremon of Alexandria, Porphyry, and Eusebius, before extending the same argument to the ancient Greeks, the Celts, the Germanic peoples, the Huns, and the Scandinavians.

He likewise extends this conclusion to the Persians, drawing on Herodotus, Xenophon, Quintus Curtius Rufus, Clement of Alexandria, Diogenes Laërtius, Theodoret, and Cassiodorus, as well as to the peoples of India, citing Lucian, Apollonius of Tyana, Philostratus, Solinus, Stephanus of Byzantium, Al-Shahrastani, Bar Hebraeus, and Athanasius Kircher.

For the rest of the world – including East Asia, sub-Saharan Africa, the Americas, and Oceania – Dupuis relies extensively on the accounts published by european travelers. His comparative survey of the world's civilizations leads him to conclude that the historical evidence consistently supports the existence of a universal religion founded on the worship of Nature.

=== Book II ===
==== The Supralunar and Sublunar Worlds ====
Before Aristotle did so, Ocellus divided the universe into two regions: the supralunar world, active and immutable, and the sublunar world, passive and subject to corruption. Dupuis also cites Plutarch, Cicero, Macrobius, and Proclus in support of this conception. This division of the universe into two complementary powers – one acting, the other reacting – formed the basis of ancient astrology.

Light proceeds from the ethereal substance of the heavens, whereas darkness is associated with earthly matter. In Hesiod's theogony, Uranus and Gaia personified these two principles, while the successive generations of deities likewise translated physical observations into symbolic language. (Note: The elements – earth, water, air, and fire – were themselves objects of worship. Mountains, forests, and rivers were deified, as were meteorological phenomena: Iris represented the rainbow, Boreas and Zephyrus the winds, and Typhon destructive storms.)

At night, objects disappear from view, leaving human beings isolated and confined to themselves. The return of daylight recreates the world by making forms visible once again. From this sensory experience, prior to any moral speculation, arose the opposition between order and chaos, good and evil.

The Sun illuminates, warms, sustains living beings, and governs the succession of days, seasons, and years. Independent of any visible cause, it naturally appeared to humanity as the sovereign of the sensible world. Dupuis cites numerous authors – notably Plato, Pliny the Elder, and Macrobius – to illustrate the pre-eminence of the Sun in ancient theology. The four cardinal points of its annual course (the solstices and equinoxes) served throughout the world as reference points for calendars and religious festivals.

The Moon was likewise deified, often as the companion of the Sun. The other wandering heavenly bodies visible to the naked eye – Venus, Mercury, Mars, Jupiter, and Saturn – completed this celestial order. Their respective colours, apparent speeds, and periods of revolution led different peoples to assign them distinct characteristics and functions within the cosmos. In Dupuis's view, it was the properties of the planets that gave rise to the attributes of the gods, rather than the reverse.

The fixed stars, by contrast, constituted immutable points of reference, at least if one disregards the precession of the equinoxes. This cosmic framework, with the Sun at its centre, provides the interpretative key that Dupuis applies to every mythology and religious tradition.

==== The Universal Soul ====
The regular motion of the heavenly bodies was interpreted as evidence of their intelligence and sovereign reason. Panpsychism was widespread among ancient philosophers: the Pythagoreans, Platonists, and Stoics all held that the heavenly bodies were animate.

According to Dupuis, the universe came to be worshipped because it was understood to be both living and intelligent, for no one offers prayers or sacrifices to inert and insensible matter. How, he asks, could human beings and animals – fragile and transient creatures – possess life and intelligence while the eternal and immense universe lacked them? Humanity therefore attributed to the universe in its entirety what sublunary beings possessed only temporarily and in infinitesimal measure.

Dupuis distinguishes this Universal Soul from the transcendent Creator God of Christianity. The Exhortation to the Greeks, traditionally attributed to Justin Martyr, presents the doctrine of Pythagoras in the following terms: ’’God is one. He is not, as some suppose, outside the world, but within it, wholly present throughout the entire universe. His eye watches over all that comes into being […]. He is the origin of all things; the light of heaven, the father, the intellect, the soul of all beings, and the mover of all the spheres.’’ Virgil, in both the Aeneid and the Georgics, likewise embraced this panpsychist conception of the universe.

=== Book III ===
Having established in the first two books the universality of the worship of Nature and the cosmological principles underlying ancient religions, Dupuis proceeds to apply his interpretative system to a series of myths. He argues that, despite the diversity of mythologies arising from differences in language and culture, they all belong to a single system. (Note: "It is the great masses that must be attacked; it is the general character of all the great religious fables that must be grasped and demonstrated. [...] Let us leave to lesser minds the mania of accounting for everything, and the weakness that confines them to details. Let us present the framework of the ancient poems with the greatest possible clarity, so that one may clearly perceive the points that connect all the principal threads and reveal the design that the poet has embroidered so richly; the gaps that remain should not surprise us.") According to Dupuis, myths were not originally historical or moral narratives but allegories intended to transmit knowledge of the natural world in symbolic form.

==== Hercules ====
Dupuis assembles the testimony of ancient authors identifying Hercules with the Sun, including Macrobius, (Note: Who wrote in the Saturnalia: Et revera Herculem solem esse vel ex nomine clare.) Porphyry, Servius, Nonnus, Athenagoras of Athens, Damascius, Cleanthes, and Chrysippus.

Following the order of the Labours given by Diodorus Siculus, he attempts to reconstruct the "sacred calendar" encoded in the myth. Besides the constellation Hercules, many of the creatures encountered by the hero also appear among the stars: Leo, (Note: In his first Labour, Hercules slays the Nemean Lion, whose skin, worn by the hero, symbolized the Sun entering the constellation Leo at the summer solstice.) Hydra, Taurus, Centaurus, Draco, and the Stymphalian birds, represented by the constellations Aquila, Cygnus, and Vultur, all situated near the Arrow and Hercules.

Some of Dupuis's identifications – particularly those associating the Erymanthian Boar with Ursa Major and the Ceryneian Hind with Cassiopeia and Scorpius – are generally regarded today as unconvincing.

==== Osiris and Isis ====
Iamblichus maintained that the deity assumed different names according to its various operations, taking the name Osiris when it diffused its beneficent influence throughout the world. According to Diodorus Siculus, Diogenes Laërtius, and Chaeremon of Alexandria, the ancient Egyptians identified the Sun with Osiris and the Moon with Isis. These two heavenly bodies were regarded as the principal causes of generation in the sublunary world.

Opposed to Osiris stood his hostile brother Typhon. Plutarch described Typhon as the principle of disorder, excess, drought, destructive winds, darkness, and corruption, whereas Osiris embodied light and order. Dupuis compares this dualism with that of Ormuzd and Ahriman in the Persian tradition.

At the time when the myth of Osiris took shape, the vernal equinox occurred in the constellation Taurus. The sacred bull Apis, worshipped at Memphis, represented the living image of Osiris, as attested by Plutarch. The murder of Osiris by Typhon and his seventy-two accomplices took place under the sign of Scorpius, through which the Sun then passed at the autumnal equinox. Plutarch specifies that the god was attacked and dismembered at the seventeenth degree of Scorpio. (Note: « λέγεται δὲ τῇ ἑπτακαιδεκάτῃ τοῦ Ἀθύρ μηνός, ἐν ᾧ τὸν Σκορπίον ὁ ἥλιος διέρχεται, τὸν Ὄσιριν ὁ Τυφὼν ἐπιβουλεύσας μετὰ δύο καὶ ἑβδομήκοντα συνεργῶν καὶ βασίλης Αἰθιοπίας… » ("It is said that on the seventeenth day of the month of Athyr, while the Sun was passing through Scorpio, Typhon conspired against Osiris with seventy-two accomplices and a queen of Ethiopia…"; De Iside et Osiride, §13, 355E).) He further explains that the fourteen pieces into which Osiris was divided symbolized the fourteen days of the waning Moon, while the twenty-eight years of Osiris corresponded to the twenty-eight days of the lunar month.

The death of Osiris symbolized the end of the Sun's fertilizing activity and the onset of the barren season. Dupuis draws a parallel with the iconography of the Mithraic Mysteries, in which the Scorpion attacks the testicles of the Bull, representing the autumnal destruction of the Sun's generative power. Porphyry identified Mithra with the Sun at the spring equinox.

Dupuis cites ancient authors – including Eratosthenes, Hyginus, Columella, Servius, Virgil, and Ovid – to argue that the legend of Osiris was understood as both an astronomical and an agricultural poem. Every episode of the narrative as recounted by Diodorus Siculus corresponded, in his view, to celestial configurations. Anubis, for example, represented Sirius: the annual flooding of the Nile coincided with the heliacal rising of that star, which occurred at the summer solstice.

==== Theseus ====
Theseus was the tutelary hero of Athens, just as Hercules was that of Thebes. According to Dupuis, the legend of Theseus, as preserved by Diodorus Siculus and Plutarch, constitutes another solar poem, although one more difficult to reconstruct.

Theseus is the son of Aethra, whose name in Greek denotes the clear and luminous sky. Ariadne, whose name Hyginus assigned to the constellation Corona Borealis, guides the hero through the Labyrinth.

His conflict with Castor and Pollux refers to the constellation Gemini. The episode of the Minotaur evokes the proximity in the heavens of Taurus and the hunter Orion. The seven youths and seven maidens sacrificed each year to the monster correspond to the seven Hyades and the seven Pleiades. Theon of Alexandria and Hyginus both described Orion pursuing these two star clusters.

Other "solar" figures also appear in his adventures. Theseus shares the love of Ariadne with Bacchus, subdues the Cretan Bull, previously overcome by Hercules, and is himself rescued from the Underworld by Hercules.

==== Jason and the Argonauts ====
Isaac Newton believed that the celestial sphere had been devised after the expedition of the Argonauts, since most of its heroes appear among the constellations. Dupuis reverses this argument, maintaining that the poem itself was composed from the celestial sphere. In his view, the historicity of the expedition is not merely improbable but displays all the marvellous characteristics of the other astral myths.

The voyage of the Argonauts represented the Sun's annual course, centred upon Aries. The quest for the Golden Fleece occupies the heart of the poem because Aries had become the vernal equinoctial sign after succeeding Taurus through the effects of the precession of the equinoxes. The winged ram is placed among the stars after the voyage, while its fleece is dedicated in a temple of Mars. Eratosthenes, Ovid, Hyginus, Marcus Manilius, and Columella all identified the mythical ram with the zodiacal sign.

Several of the poem's principal characters likewise correspond to constellations, including Hercules, the Dioscuri, Cepheus, and Draco, which guards the Fleece until lulled to sleep by the music of Orpheus's Lyre.

The Argonautica attributed to Orpheus opens with an invocation to Apollo, the solar god victorious over Python.

==== Bacchus ====
The mother of Bacchus was Semele, a goddess symbolizing the earth scorched by the lightning of Zeus. In the Orphic tradition, however, Dionysus was regarded as the son of Persephone, goddess of spring.

Macrobius maintained that the Sun received the name Apollo in the upper region of the universe, where pure light reigns, and that of Bacchus in the lower region, where dark and passive matter is subject to generation and decay.

Herodotus and Plutarch both wrote that the cult and festivals of Bacchus originated in Egypt. According to Diodorus Siculus, the Greeks called Bacchus what the Egyptians called Osiris. He was frequently represented with horns, transformed into a bull, or accompanied by that animal, much like Osiris-Apis. Like his Egyptian counterpart, Bacchus periodically died and was reborn.

==== Vernal Bulls and Rams ====
Because of the precession of the equinoxes, the vernal equinox shifts from one zodiacal sign to another approximately every two millennia. Throughout Egyptian history, the vernal point thus passed successively through Taurus and Aries.

Iamblichus and Lucian reported that the Egyptians represented the Sun under the forms of the zodiacal animals through which it passed. According to Macrobius, the sacred bulls of Egypt received the same honours as the Sun itself, especially at Heliopolis and Memphis. Apis, according to Plutarch, was the living image of Osiris. Born of a cow impregnated by celestial fire, his oracles derived from astronomy, and his existence was governed by the signs of the heavens.

Ancient sources – including Pliny the Elder, Solinus, and Ammianus Marcellinus – agree that Apis bore a white crescent upon his shoulder, together with markings corresponding to the phases of the Moon. Aelian mentions twenty-nine such markings, matching the length of the lunar cycle. Dupuis develops a parallel with Persian cosmology, in which the seed of the Primordial Bull is entrusted to the Moon. Mithra rides the Bull and presides over the springtime regeneration of nature. (Note: The Epic of Gilgamesh, unknown in Dupuis's time, likewise depicts its hero overcoming the Bull of Heaven.)

According to Dupuis, the spring Bull was succeeded by the Ram approximately twenty-five centuries before the Christian era. Proclus explained the Egyptian veneration of the ram, the sacred animal of Amun, as reverence for the first sign of the zodiac and for the awakening of generative power. Hyginus recounts a tradition derived from Hermippus of Smyrna: during Dionysus' expedition into Africa, a ram guided the army across the desert to a spring – the oasis of Siwa, later visited by Alexander the Great. The ram was afterwards placed among the stars and became the foremost of the zodiacal signs.

==== Pan ====
According to Dupuis, caprine deities should be understood in relation to the constellations Capricornus and Capella, carried by the constellation Auriga, situated immediately above Taurus in the night sky.

At Phlius, Delphi, in certain aspects of the cult of Asclepius, in the Arcadian traditions surrounding Pan, and in the myth of Amalthea and the cornucopia, the goat symbolized fertility, vital force, vegetation, and the renewal of spring.

The Orphic Hymn to Pan shows that he was regarded not merely as a pastoral deity but as the "substance of the cosmos". For Dupuis, his seven-reed pipe represented the seven planetary spheres. and Echo, repeating Pan's music, symbolized the universal resonance produced by the motion of the celestial spheres.

==== Apollo and Horus ====
The identification of Apollo with the Sun is, for Dupuis, beyond dispute. He assembles an extensive body of ancient testimony, including passages from Cicero and Plato.

Callimachus described Apollo as eternally beautiful and youthful. The Orphic Hymns portray him as a radiant young hero, while Horace calls him "beardless Phoebus". Among the four ages of the Sun distinguished by Macrobius, Apollo therefore represents spring. During the Ludi Apollinares, white oxen and goats with gilded horns were sacrificed to him – a clear reminder, in Dupuis's view, of the equinoctial constellations.

Diodorus Siculus records a Hyperborean tradition according to which Apollo returned every nineteen years, corresponding to the Metonic cycle. These festivals began at the spring equinox and continued until the heliacal rising of the Pleiades, confirming that spring was the season of Apollo's theophany. His victory over the serpent Python, representing the darkness of winter, marked the restoration of universal harmony.

According to the testimony of Horapollo and Macrobius, Horus presided over the orderly succession of the seasons. This youthful and victorious god likewise symbolized the rebirth of the Sun after winter. His struggle against Typhon expressed the same cosmic reality as Apollo's victory over Python.

==== Adonis and Attis ====
Adonis was a Levantine deity who spent half the year in the upper region of the heavens, under the dominion of light, and the other half in the lower region, the underworld. Dupuis compares him with Osiris, Bacchus, and the other solar deities who die and are reborn. The ritual lamentations, festivals, and mysteries celebrated in his honour confirm, in Dupuis's view, that the cult of Adonis derived from observation of the seasonal cycle.

Attis, the Phrygian consort of Cybele, was depicted as a young shepherd wearing a cap adorned with stars. His self-castration, like the dismemberment of Osiris, symbolized the loss of the Sun's generative power at the autumnal equinox.

==== Asclepius and Harpocrates ====
Dupuis next considers those deities which, in his interpretation, symbolize the Sun's decline during autumn and winter, when it set in the constellations Serpens and Ophiuchus. Eratosthenes, Hyginus, and later Servius all identified Ophiuchus with Asclepius, who had been instructed by Chiron, represented by the neighbouring constellation Centaurus.

When the days were long and radiant, Dupuis argues, the Sun's light was identified with Horus; when the days became short and weak, that same light became Harpocrates. Harpocrates was sometimes associated with the frog, an animal the ancients believed to arise spontaneously from the mud left by the receding Nile. He was also represented as a child seated upon a lotus, symbolizing the birth and renewal of the Sun.

Harpocrates united the characteristics of infancy and decrepitude, the two extremes of weakness. His characteristic gesture – a finger placed upon his lips – symbolized childhood, when speech has not yet developed. (Note: Dupuis recalls the original meaning of the Latin word infans: one who cannot yet speak.) He was frequently depicted bald, like Asclepius, and the priests of his cult likewise shaved their heads. Macrobius explained that their baldness imitated the Sun reaching the winter solstice.

This image of a god unsteady upon his feet contrasted with that of the winged Horus, symbol of the triumphant light of spring and summer.

The cult of Harpocrates, inseparable from those of Serapis and Isis, spread widely during the final decades of the Roman Republic and the early Roman Empire. Dupuis compares it to the Christian devotion to the Infant Jesus.

==== Ichthyomorphic Deities ====
The Phoenician god Dagon derived his name, according to Dupuis, from the Semitic word dag, meaning "fish". (Note: This etymology, found notably in Jerome, was repeated by many medieval writers. Modern linguists generally derive the name from the Semitic root dgn, meaning "grain" or "cereal" (cf. Hebrew dāgān), reflecting Dagon's role as a deity of fertility and agricultural abundance.) The celestial Fishes, he notes, were called Daggim by Hebrew astronomers. Dupuis cites the rabbi David Kimhi, who wrote that the torso of the Philistine statue of Dagon – overturned before the Ark of the Covenant in the First Book of Samuel – was shaped like a fish.

Xenophon, Eratosthenes, Cicero, Nigidius Figulus, Diodorus Siculus, Hyginus, Strabo, Lucian, and Clement of Alexandria all attest to the religious veneration of fish in Syria, accompanied by a prohibition against eating them. Strabo, Pliny the Elder, Josephus, and Pausanias report that the inhabitants of Jaffa showed visitors the rock to which Andromeda had been chained before being rescued by Perseus from the sea monster Cetus. All these constellations, situated near Pisces, occupy the same region of the sky.

The goddess Derceto, worshipped at Hierapolis, was represented as a woman with the body of a fish. Diodorus Siculus relates that, after incurring the anger of Venus, she transformed herself and threw herself into a lake near Ashkelon, while her daughter, nourished by doves, became Semiramis. Dupuis observes that this legend already contains symbols later adopted by Christianity, while interpreting it as a poetic transposition of the starry heavens: the constellation Virgo stands opposite Pisces on the zodiac.

Lucian, in De Dea Syria, describes the temple at Hierapolis dedicated to the "Assyrian Juno", whose image bore the attributes of Virgo and Pisces. The luminous selenite adorning the statue of Derceto symbolized the Moon, imitating both its brilliance and its changing phases. According to Dupuis, the temple's central rite – the pouring of seawater into a sacred pit twice each year – possessed an astronomical meaning connected with the constellation Aquarius. (Note: Dupuis notes that Deucalion, the hero of the Flood, was placed by Hyginus in Aquarius, while the Piscis Austrinus receives the waters flowing from the celestial river.)

The chapter concludes with a critique of priestly artifices – moving statues, oracles, and miraculous narratives – designed to impress the faithful. Such practices, Dupuis argues, obscured the original astronomical theology beneath layers of fable and ritual imposture.

==== The Baals ====
Dupuis examines the deities of Mesopotamia and the Levant. His knowledge of these religions was derived primarily from Greco-Roman authors, as well as from Jewish and Christian traditions, which were often hostile to the cults they described. His work was published before the decipherment of cuneiform writing and the development of Assyriology, and many of his interpretations are now obsolete.

At the head of these deities stood Baal or Belus, a title meaning "lord" or "master". Dupuis interprets this figure as a solar god and cites Nonnus in support of this identification. The monumental temple of Baal (Marduk) at Babylon was crowned by a tower that served as an observatory for priest-astrologers. The animals decorating its sanctuaries – serpents, lions, and bulls – are interpreted as astral symbols. Dupuis next examines the various Baalim, whose names combine the title Baal with a local or functional epithet. Baal Peor is identified with a Priapic deity associated with fertility. Although Jewish authors condemned his worship as obscene, Dupuis interprets its licentious rites as symbolic expressions of the Sun's generative power in spring.

He also discusses Beelzebub, the god of the Philistine city of Ekron, who later became the prince of demons in Christian tradition. According to Dupuis, Beelzebub was originally a healing deity: his epithet, "lord of the flies", referred to rites intended to ward off plagues and epidemics. The polemics of Jewish and Christian writers, he argues, obscured the original significance of his cult.

Dupuis concludes that the multiplicity of the Baalim – Baal-Berith, Baal-zephon, Baal-Gad, Adrammelech, Anammelech, Moloch, Nergal, Nisroch, Nabu, and others – represented a figurative decomposition of the heavens. The Sun, planets, stars, and cardinal directions were personified as tutelary spirits and local deities. Their worship formed part, in his view, of the astrological doctrine of celestial influences upon human destiny: they were invoked in order to obtain favourable fortune. (Note: Dupuis compares them with certain Greek and Roman divinities, including Fortuna, the Agathodaemon, and Trophonius.) He draws a parallel with the heavenly host of the Hebrews.

=== Book IV ===
==== Idolatrous Cults ====
===== Statues and Images =====
As Porphyry wrote, those who regard statues as nothing more than wood or stone are like illiterate people who see nothing but papyrus in a book. Idols were considered receptacles capable of attracting celestial powers able to deliver oracles, heal the sick, or foretell the future.

The emperor Julian argued that statues were visible signs intended to honour invisible gods, just as portraits of rulers express devotion to their persons. The true divinities, according to Julian, were the heavenly bodies themselves.

Dupuis acknowledges that ordinary worshippers often stop at the image itself, attributing an intrinsic divine power to material objects – a phenomenon corresponding to the "fetishism" conceptualized by Charles de Brosses in 1760. Popular Christianity, he argues, is no exception: statues of Christ, the Virgin, and the saints are often venerated in themselves. A foreign observer might therefore conclude that Christians worship wood, stone, or relics. The clergy, however, explain that the honours paid to these objects are in fact directed toward invisible beings. Dupuis contends that the same reasoning should therefore be applied to other religions.

Images constitute a form of writing and, like every writing system, require mastery of a symbolic language. The same signs may possess different meanings depending upon their context, just as words do within a language. Dupuis distinguishes hieroglyphic writing from astrological symbolism: the heavens provide an essential, though not exclusive, key to interpreting ancient cults.

===== Animals =====
The Roman satirical poet Juvenal mocked the Egyptians for worshipping the ox, the dog, the crocodile, the cat, the onion, and the lotus. Dupuis regarded such criticism as evidence of ignorance. In his view, animals were not worshipped because of their usefulness, contrary to the explanation proposed by Plutarch and Cicero. Otherwise, why would the Egyptians have honoured the lion, wolf, crocodile, hippopotamus, or serpent, creatures that were dangerous or harmful? Why venerate both the crocodile and the Egyptian mongoose, which destroys the crocodile's eggs? Dupuis notes that Plutarch himself, when discussing animals lacking any obvious utility, ultimately resorted to symbolic explanations.

According to Dupuis, the Bull, Lion, Ram, Wolf, and Canis Major corresponded to the constellations bearing their names, themselves associated with phases of the Sun and Moon as well as terrestrial phenomena, particularly the inundation of the Nile.

Sphinxes, centaurs, chimaeras, and other mythical creatures appear absurd only to those unfamiliar with symbolic language. Likewise, Indian, Chinese, and Japanese deities represented with multiple arms, heads, or attributes follow a coherent symbolic logic: each element signifies a particular power, function, or aspect of Nature.

===== Plants, Metals, and Minerals =====
The lotus symbolized the rising Sun emerging from the primordial waters. Resin, myrrh, the palm tree, the bay laurel, and the oak were revered because of their symbolic associations with the heavenly bodies. Thus arose an entire system of correspondences based upon the form, colour, number of parts, and behaviour of plants. Among metals, gold and silver were respectively dedicated to the Sun and the Moon because of their colours. Certain stones were likewise believed to receive or reflect celestial influences, such as selenite for the Moon and heliotrope for the Sun.

Dupuis emphasizes the illusory character of these systems of correspondence, constructed upon perceived analogies between celestial and terrestrial bodies. Astrology, together with other forms of divination, magical medicine, and the use of talismans, rested upon the panpsychist belief that celestial influences operated throughout the sublunary world. In support of this interpretation, he cites Porphyry, Hermes Trismegistus, Plotinus, and Iamblichus.

=== Treatise on the Mysteries ===
The mystery cults occupied a central place in ancient societies. They were among the oldest and most revered institutions of antiquity, to the extent that one of the gravest offences was the disclosure of their secrets. All mystery cults shared a common structure: preliminary purifications, fasting and abstinence, nocturnal processions, the use of torches, physical and moral trials, and, above all, a final revelation accompanied by the promise of a better fate after death.

Dupuis cites numerous testimonies concerning the moral function and eschatological dimension of the Eleusinian Mysteries, the most celebrated mystery cult of ancient Greece. Their authority was such that even the enemies of Athens respected the sacred territory of Eleusis, while many of antiquity's greatest figures – emperors, philosophers, and poets – sought initiation into their rites. Cicero maintained that the Mysteries taught people both to live with serenity and to die with hope. Aristides described them as a revelation that transformed the initiate's entire life, while Isocrates declared that initiates enjoyed a happier destiny in Hades than the uninitiated. Plutarch compared the soul's condition after the ceremony to the emergence of light from darkness.

The Eleusinian Mysteries dramatized the myth of Demeter searching for her abducted daughter Persephone. Dupuis notes the close resemblance between this legend and that of Isis seeking Osiris. He recalls that Herodotus, Plato, Plutarch, and Diodorus Siculus all traced many Greek religious traditions back to Egypt.

Before reaching the final vision, the initiate underwent ordeals intended to inspire fear. Ritual terror played an essential role in initiation. The final revelation of the Mysteries remains unknown because of the absolute secrecy surrounding it. Ancient authors nevertheless agreed that it was symbolic and visual rather than verbal.

The Eleusinian Mysteries contributed to maintaining respect for the law. Belief in the immortality of the soul and its posthumous trials guaranteed social order. The oaths sworn during initiation reinforced civic cohesion, while the exclusion of the impious and of criminals clearly marked the boundaries of the moral community. Because the Mysteries taught the existence of a cosmic order and a higher justice, they were able to strengthen political order. Among the Athenians, the close association between the priesthood and civic institutions (Note: The archon basileus, a civil magistrate, presided over the religious ceremonies associated with the Mysteries. The offices of the hierophant and the dadouchos illustrate a rigorously defined ritual hierarchy. Dupuis compares priestly families such as the Eumolpidae and the Kerykes to the hereditary religious castes of ancient Egypt.) closely united religious norms with the laws of the city.

==== Philosophical Examination of the Mysteries ====
Dupuis writes: "Imposture and illusion have been the principal instruments of politics and the great means of civilization. This must be taken as an incontestable axiom."

The Mysteries, he argues, arose from a combination of ignorance and political calculation, from a "tyrannical alliance between priests and kings". Frightened by natural phenomena they could not understand, human beings projected their fears and hopes onto invisible powers. Priests, presenting themselves as indispensable intermediaries, developed an economy of reward and punishment. Religion thus became "an interested commerce between man and the gods", in which ritual practices and offerings were exchanged for promises of protection.

According to Dupuis, the Mysteries always served to shield the priesthood from rational scrutiny and to impose doctrines without justification. What is mysterious escapes reason and cannot be debated; what is sacred is beyond criticism. He describes the means by which popular adherence was secured: ceremonies, music, festivals, and spectacles were designed to arouse enthusiasm. "The people were treated like children", he writes, preferring "to mislead their reason by marvellous tales rather than improve it through reflection and philosophy." This infantilization, he argues, inspired "panic terrors and ridiculous prejudices, making them timid and credulous."

The ancients believed that people could be guided toward virtue only through illusion. Cicero reports the opinion that religions were "invented by the wise... in order to guide those whom reason alone could not bring back to duty." Likewise, according to Timaeus of Locri, "minds must also be restrained by falsehoods whenever truth proves powerless."

Dupuis condemns this attitude, arguing that "no one has the right to deceive another." The Mysteries may have been effective political instruments, but they were fundamentally incompatible with human dignity: "it is false that it is more useful to deceive than to instruct."

Public education ought therefore to replace fables, secrets, and ceremonies. "Let us close the sanctuaries, where everything is illusion and deception, and derive our ideas of order and wisdom from the contemplation of the Universe. There is our only temple. Let us study the secrets of Nature. Let these alone be our mysteries." Civilization, he concludes, will then advance through the cumulative transmission of knowledge, and "the torch of reason will never again be extinguished."

"For us, who live in an age in which the French neither can nor wish any longer to be deceived, it is from the sources of justice and eternal reason that we must derive our laws. It is finally time to see whether the people, having recovered the rights of their sovereignty, will still tolerate being deceived like children or slaves. They have the right to claim equality in reason and wisdom, which, if our education is sound, will no longer remain the privilege of a few men. [...]"

Dupuis therefore envisages an enlightened intellectual minority – perhaps only temporarily – whose role would be to study nature and educate the people, without inventing useful beliefs for the purpose of governing them.

Supposedly necessary fictions, he argues, serve only to corrupt morality, which ought instead to rest upon reason, human sympathy, and the common good. Human beings have every interest in acting justly, benevolently, and in solidarity with one another, not because they fear another world, but because they live together and depend upon one another. A morality founded upon the fear of hell is merely servile. The true Elysium and the true Tartarus should consist respectively in the satisfaction of duty fulfilled and the remorse born of crime. Christianity, by replacing this immanent conception of justice with a system of transcendent rewards and punishments, diverts humanity from genuine moral responsibility.

Dupuis further emphasizes the central role of fear within Christianity, which he regards as incompatible – when its precepts are followed rigorously – with the requirements of social life. The believer is held in a permanent state of guilt and fear of punishment, thereby reinforcing priestly authority, since only the Church possesses the power to grant absolution. The faithful remain "suspended between hope and fear", because the sinner is simultaneously guilty and redeemable. Expiatory ceremonies, inherited from ancient rites of purification, perpetuate the individual's dependence upon the religious institution.

The idea that a virtuous but uninitiated person might be condemned, while a baptized criminal could attain salvation, is, for Dupuis, fundamentally incompatible with justice. (Note: "Eleusis closed its gates to Nero; the Christians would have admitted him, had he declared himself one of them. What a dreadful religion, that welcomes into its bosom the cruelest tyrants, makes them its protectors, and absolves every crime! What! Nero, had he been a Christian, would have been a saint! Why not? Constantine, no less guilty than he, is one. Reason and nature would never have absolved Nero. The Christian religion would have absolved him had he been baptized. What horror! There are monsters who must be abandoned to remorse and to the terror of the Furies. The religion that calms them encourages crime. Such a religion must therefore be regarded as a disastrous institution, a genuine monstrosity in politics as in morality.") According to Dupuis, "religion should speak only the language of the laws."

Despite their artifices, the Eleusinian Mysteries remained closely associated with the practice of civic virtue. Their strength – and at the same time their principal defect – lay in their exclusiveness. They were reserved for those considered worthy of initiation. This closed organization "raised a wall of separation between those who had been initiated and those who had not." Dupuis compares them to the secret societies of his own day: "People sought initiation just as they become Freemasons, to satisfy both their curiosity and their vanity."

=== Treatise on the Christian Religion ===
Nothing is more important for a philosopher, Dupuis writes, than critically examining the religion in which one has been raised. Religion accompanies human beings from the cradle, governs their lives, and continues to exert its influence at the moment of death through the fears and hopes it inspires. This pervasive influence explains both the power of religion and the difficulty of examining it rationally.

He distinguishes two attitudes toward religion that he considers equally mistaken. The first is that of submissive believers, who accept religious doctrines out of habit, fear, or deference to priestly authority. The second is that of hasty unbelievers, who reject religion out of instinctive aversion. Dupuis reproaches these "new philosophers" for having substituted satire for analysis in their struggle against the clergy. In ridiculing popular credulity, they had not thereby freed themselves from ignorance. His own aim is to adopt an intermediate position: neither to believe blindly nor to reject without understanding.

Great moral phenomena, like great physical phenomena, require causes proportionate to their effects. If doctrines have been accepted for centuries by numerous peoples with profound reverence and passionate attachment, they cannot be explained as the result of accidental delusion. Religions become absurd only when their images and symbols are mistaken for literal realities. The philosopher must therefore understand sacred texts as allegories, worthy of study because of their antiquity, their diffusion, and their historical importance.

He acknowledges that Christianity appears, at first sight, irreducible to other religions. He argues, however, that this impression rests solely upon the opinion that each people forms of its own religion, an opinion that proves nothing beyond the sincerity of its belief. He recalls that the Greeks and Romans mocked the gods of Egypt while worshipping the same powers under different names. A people's misunderstanding of the true object of its worship does not alter the nature of that worship.

For Dupuis, Jesus Christ is neither God nor a historical figure, but a symbolic figure analogous to Hercules or Osiris – that is, a personification of the Sun. He recognizes that this conclusion will offend many of his contemporaries. The common people deify Christ, while the philosopher sees only a man; Dupuis rejects both interpretations, arguing that the Sun is in fact further removed from human nature than it is from divine nature.

He expresses the hope that enlightened readers will follow him in this inquiry. The consolation of having been deceived lies in knowing that the same error was shared by entire generations. He appeals to the sincere pursuit of truth and to the capacity of human reason to free itself from even the most deeply rooted illusions.

Dupuis begins by establishing a logical dependence between two central Christian doctrines: original sin and redemption through Christ. If the former is merely an allegory, then the latter must be as well. "Without sin, there is no redemption; without the guilty, there is no redeemer."

Drawing upon the English theologian Thomas Burnet, as quoted by the Protestant scholar Isaac de Beausobre, he examines the opening chapters of Genesis. He enumerates what he considers the principal improbabilities of the narrative: an invisible God tending a garden, a woman conversing with a serpent, an act of eating resulting in the damnation of millions, a human race supposedly immortal yet capable of reproduction, and the pains of childbirth presented as moral punishment despite arising from biological constitution. Only indoctrination from childhood, he argues, can accustom people to such fictions.

Maimonides maintained that Genesis should not be interpreted literally and that its true meaning ought to remain concealed from the common people. Whereas most interpreters sought its allegorical meaning in the sphere of morality, Dupuis argues that its symbolism is proto-scientific. Genesis should therefore be understood as a cosmogony: a symbolic representation of the order of nature, first causes, and the great physical phenomena of the universe.

He compares Genesis with the Persian cosmogony as known through the Avesta and the Bundahishn. Dupuis identifies several parallels: an original state of happiness, the irruption of evil, the opposition between two principles, and the emergence of suffering and corruption. Ahriman, the counterpart of Satan, introduces into the creation of Ahura Mazda a demonic serpent symbolizing the darkness of winter.

Dupuis concludes that the Fall in Genesis signifies not merely a moral transgression but, more fundamentally, a cosmic transformation associated with the alternation of the seasons and the periodic withdrawal of light. The redeemer can therefore only be the Sun, which regains its dominion over darkness each spring. The gradual return of daylight, warmth, and fertility is, in his interpretation, symbolized by Christ. The ancients never claimed that the Sun literally died; its death was only apparent and relative, corresponding to the growing predominance of night.

The birth of Christ is celebrated when daylight begins once more to increase, on 25 December, the date of the festival of the "Sol Invictus" in the late Roman Empire. The twelve apostles correspond, according to Dupuis, to the twelve signs of the zodiac. (Note: The sacred numbers that structure the Gospels – the seven demons expelled from Mary Magdalene, the twelve baskets filled after the feeding of the multitude, and the seventy-two disciples sent ahead – are all drawn from ancient astronomy.) The Virgin Mary is not a historical woman but the constellation Virgo. Christian iconography of the Virgin and Child derives, he argues, from that of Isis. In an inscription from the temple of Sais, quoted by Plutarch, Isis declares that the child she bore is the Sun.

In the Eclogues, Virgil announced the birth of a miraculous child inaugurating a new age: "Now the Virgin returns, now the reign of Saturn returns; now a new offspring is sent down from heaven above" ("Iam redit et Virgo, redeunt Saturnia regna; iam nova progenies caelo demittitur alto"). Christian writers interpreted these verses as a prophecy of Christ's birth. Dupuis, by contrast, regards them as pagan evidence that the motifs of the Virgin and the birth of a celestial saviour predated Christianity.

He interprets the Crucifixion as an astronomical symbol representing the four cardinal points of the solar year – the two solstices and the two equinoxes. The crucified Christ thus represents the Sun fixed to the immutable laws of its annual revolution. Christianity merely reworked, in a more realistic and dramatic form, the most ancient of myths: the death and rebirth of the Sun.

Dupuis recalls that the spring equinox was celebrated with joy and triumph throughout the religions of antiquity. The lamentations accompanying the death of the god gave way to public rejoicing, songs, and feasts. Likewise, in Christianity, Good Friday, commemorating the Crucifixion, is followed by Easter Sunday, celebrating the Resurrection. The date of Holy Week is itself determined by the full Moon and the spring equinox.

Because of the axial precession, which causes the Sun to pass slowly through different constellations at the solstices and equinoxes, the coming of spring was originally associated with the constellation Taurus, whose restorative blood was shed in the rites of the ancient religions. The succeeding astrological age was that of Aries, from which Dupuis derives the Christian symbolism of the sacrificial Lamb.

According to Dupuis's calculations, the constellation that succeeded Aries some three centuries before the Common Era was Pisces, the emblem adopted by the earliest Christians in the form of the Ichthys. At the opposite point of the zodiac, the autumnal equinox aligned with Virgo, identified with the mother of Christ. Dupuis nevertheless remains silent regarding Pisces. He does not analyse the Gospels as he had analysed the pagan myths. (Note: Why did Dupuis not carry his argument to its logical conclusion? The Christian symbolism of Pisces fits naturally within his astronomical system. There are plenty of examples : the two fish that Jesus raises toward heaven before the feeding of the multitude; the fish in whose mouth Saint Peter finds a coin worth four drachmas; the fish eaten by the risen Christ in the presence of his disciples; and many others. Why, then, does Dupuis remain silent? Was it considered inappropriate, or dangerous, to analyse the Gospels as he had the pagan fables? This explanation seems unconvincing, since he openly denied the historicity of Jesus. Another possibility is that he deliberately avoided lending retrospective legitimacy to the authority of the Church through his own interpretative system. Perhaps Christianity, unlike Judaism or Islam, represented the religion appropriate to the contemporary zodiacal age, that of Pisces. Later writers, beginning with Godfrey Higgins, explicitly associated the astrological age of Pisces with Christianity and predicted the coming Age of Aquarius.) "I shall pursue these reflections no further, because the purpose of this work is not to expose every error born of ignorance or every audacity of imposture, but to restore the Christian religion to its true origin, to trace its genealogy, to show the connection that unites it with all others, and to demonstrate that it is likewise enclosed within the circle of the universal religion, or the worship of Nature and the Sun."

Instead, Dupuis turns to the doctrines of the unity of God and of the Trinity, seeking to demonstrate that neither is unique to Christianity.

Even polytheistic religions, he argues, presuppose a supreme principle from which subordinate powers proceed. Among the Greeks and Romans this principle was represented by Zeus or Jupiter, whom Virgil described as filling the universe ("Iovis omnia plena"). The other gods were merely subordinate powers, comparable to angels and saints in Christianity.

The doctrine of divine unity appears in the Orphic and Sibylline traditions, among philosophers such as Plato, Aristotle, the Pythagoreans, and the Stoics, and among dramatists including Euripides and Sophocles. The Church Fathers, notably Justin Martyr, Athenagoras of Athens, Lactantius, and Augustine of Hippo, themselves acknowledged that pagan authors had already professed a form of knowledge of the one God.

Similarly, the Christian doctrine of the Trinity represents, according to Dupuis, a continuation of earlier metaphysical speculation. The unity of the world may be conceived under three complementary aspects: the Universal Being, the supreme principle; the Holy Spirit, or Soul of the World, the principle of life; and the Logos, the principle of the intelligibility of the cosmos. (Note: The Prologue of the Gospel of John adopts the Greek term Logos, already employed by the Stoics and by Philo of Alexandria.) Dupuis compares this triadic structure with a wide range of philosophical and religious doctrines, particularly Platonism, Stoicism, and the Hermetica, especially the Poimandres and the Asclepius.

The Christian symbols of the dove, fire, and the seven gifts of the Holy Spirit are inherited from Judaism. Dupuis concludes that Christian theology drew extensively upon the religions of antiquity. It therefore possesses nothing of the character of a supernatural revelation.

==== Examination of the Book of Revelation ====
The ancients believed in the periodic regeneration of the world according to the cosmic cycle of the Great Year: summer brought destruction by fire (ekpyrosis), while winter brought destruction by water through the Flood. This belief rested upon the doctrines of eternal return and apokatastasis, the restoration of all things to their original state.

Dupuis reviews a number of ancient authors who referred to this doctrine. Censorinus reported that Heraclitus assigned the Great Year a duration of 10,800 years. Servius explained the astrological foundations of the theory. Origen opposed the doctrine, observing that it was widely held among Egyptians, Pythagoreans, and Platonists. Synesius accepted the existence of both simple and composite cosmic cycles, while Seneca envisaged periodic catastrophes followed by the restoration of humanity's original innocence.

The Babylonian astronomer Berossus, heir to a long intellectual tradition, described a period of 432,000 years (twelve cycles of 36,000 years). Dupuis argues that such figures were not derived from observation but from mathematical constructions intended to produce the periodic coincidences required by astrological prediction. The same numerical scheme appears, multiplied by ten, in Indian cosmology, where the world cycle lasts 4,320,000 years and is divided into four ages of 1,728,000, 1,296,000, 864,000, and 432,000 years respectively.

The ancients lacked the means to establish such systems with certainty, but the fiction nevertheless sufficed to support predictions that appeared credible to the public. By claiming to know the destiny of the universe as well as that of humanity, astrologers exploited popular credulity.

For Dupuis, the Book of Revelation provides one of the clearest examples of the abuse of a literal interpretation of an originally symbolic text, transforming it into an eschatological threat hanging over believers. He regards it as an instrument for governing consciences through fear, particularly effective during periods of crisis and instability.

He begins by emphasizing the obscurity of the text. The Revelation was for a long time rejected or treated with suspicion. Some church councils omitted it altogether, numerous ecclesiastical writers questioned its authenticity, and even the Church Fathers acknowledged their inability to provide a coherent interpretation.

Ancient and modern Christian commentators alike, Dupuis observes, constantly contradicted one another, assigning the Apocalypse successive historical meanings – the early persecutions of Christians, the fall of the Roman Empire, the expansion of Islam, the Wars of Religion – which were invariably refuted by subsequent events. A text capable of being adapted to every age, he concludes, predicts no particular event, and certainly not the imminent end of the world.

Whereas the canonical Gospels present a relatively clear doctrinal message, the Book of Revelation employs an abrupt style, violent imagery, discontinuous visions, and an accumulation of symbols borrowed from Eastern traditions. Yet it ultimately secured its place as the final sacred book of the Christian Bible. Dupuis attributes its success to the emotional intensity of its language. According to Dupuis, this symbolic language was intended to communicate truths about natural cycles and catastrophes to the uneducated, while its deeper meaning remained accessible only to initiates. The terrifying visions of monstrous creatures and divine punishments should therefore be understood as pedagogical devices rather than literal prophecies.

He further observes the cyclical structure of the narrative: the opening of the seals, the sounding of the trumpets, the pouring out of the bowls, repeated falls, and recurring battles. The forces of evil are never permanently destroyed; they are defeated, bound, and then reappear in an endlessly renewed struggle. The Four Horsemen of the Apocalypse symbolize recurring calamities – droughts, disease, famine, and wars arising from scarcity – which repeatedly afflict humanity throughout the book.

The Dragon represents the destructive principle associated with darkness, cold, and winter. The Woman of the Apocalypse, surrounded by astral attributes, personifies fruitful nature and the principle of light. Her persecution by the Dragon expresses the struggle between fertility and sterility. She is defended by the archangel Michael, who casts down the Dragon, recalling the victory of Apollo over Python and that of Horus over Typhon.

The Whore of Babylon symbolize matter surrendered to excess and corruption. Its destruction expresses nature's necessity of destroying whatever has exceeded its proper limits.

The entire narrative is constructed around symbolic numbers – 7, 12, 24, 72, and 144,000 – derived from ancient astronomy: the seven planets, the twelve signs of the zodiac, the twenty-four hours of the day, and the mathematical divisions of the heavens. Their presence demonstrates, in Dupuis's view, that the work was composed by an author deeply versed in astrology. The number seven, in particular, structures the entire book: the seven churches, seven lampstands, seven stars, seven seals, seven trumpets, seven thunders, seven plagues, seven bowls, and the seven heads and seven diadems of Satan.

The dimensions of the New Jerusalem, its perfect cubic form – with twelve gates, sides measuring twelve thousand stadia, and walls one hundred and forty-four cubits thick – likewise correspond to the mathematical divisions of the cosmos. The heavenly city represents the state of harmony succeeding chaos. The number of the elect, 144,000 – twelve squared multiplied by one thousand – expresses the completion of a cosmic cycle. The judgment described in Revelation, Dupuis concludes, is not that of individual souls. Its judicial language is fundamentally metaphorical.

== Reception in the English-speaking world ==
Dupuis's ideas quickly reached England. In 1797, at Bristol, the Unitarian minister John Prior Estlin published an attempt to refute The Origin of All Religious Worship, which had "frequently been spoken of in this country, as a work of great erudition." Outraged by Dupuis's Christ myth theory, Estlin reproached him for condemning not only "Popery" but every other form of Christianity as well. He regarded the book as "a dark and joyless scene — the grave of every refined and elevated sentiment."

A few months later, Estlin was followed by another Unitarian, the renowned chemist Joseph Priestley. Having suffered religious persecution in England and gone into exile in Philadelphia, Priestley published a lengthy attack on The Origin of All Religious Worship. Its opening words set the tone: "Mr Dupuis's work is certainly the most extraordinary production of the present, or of any preceding age, and the in plus ultra of infidelity." He also directed his criticism against Volney, who happened to be in Philadelphia at the time.

The Scottish diplomat William Drummond of Logiealmond, a Fellow of the Royal Society and former Member of Parliament, drew extensively on Dupuis's work in writing his Oedipus Judaicus (1811).

In 1816, the retired American presidents Thomas Jefferson and John Adams exchanged letters discussing Destutt de Tracy's analysis of The Origin of All Religious Worship. Adams had acquired the complete thirteen-volume original edition, which he was reading with great interest.

In one of the last letters exchanged between the two Founding Fathers of the United States, dated January 1825, John Adams wrote: "There exists I believe throughout the whole Christian world a law which makes it blasphemy to deny or to doubt the divine inspiration of all the books of the old and new Testaments from Genesis to Revelations. […] Who would run the risk of translating Volney’s Recherches Nouvelles? who would run the risk of translating Dupuis?" (Note: A few weeks later, referring to General Alexander Smyth's interpretation of the Book of Revelation, Adams remarked to his old friend: "I wish he had read Dupuis.")

By the end of the Georgian era, Dupuis's writings had become highly influential in British anti-Christian circles. Robert Taylor discovered the French author after his release from prison in 1829, having served a sentence for blasphemy. He made Dupuis's theories the substance of the sermons he delivered before the Rotunda radicals. On Easter Sunday 1831, he staged a parody of the Eucharist and declared that Christ's blood symbolized the decline of the Sun at the autumnal equinox, an assertion that earned him another conviction for blasphemy. After his death, his sermons were collected under the title The Devil's Pulpit; or, Astro-Theological Sermons.

Anacalypsis, the mythographical work of Godfrey Higgins, published posthumously in 1836, contains some eighty references to Dupuis, particularly concerning the succession of astrological ages brought about by the precession of the equinoxes. Higgins discussed the Christian symbolism associated with the Age of Pisces – a subject on which Dupuis had remained silent – and believed that the Age of Aquarius had begun at the beginning of the nineteenth century.

Paradoxically, Dupuis's radical rationalism – which, although it regarded myths as poetic expressions of astronomical realities, treated esotericism as a priestly imposture to be dispelled by science – became one of the sources of inspiration for the emerging New Age movement. References to The Origin of All Religious Worship can be found, for example, in the writings of the occultist Helena Blavatsky, the founder of Theosophy, and in those of Gerald Massey.

Within academia, Max Müller, Professor of Comparative Philology at the University of Oxford, developed an astronomical interpretation of Indian mythology. Like Dupuis – though never citing him – he argued that myths, as metaphorical expressions of natural phenomena, gradually lost their original meaning over successive generations and eventually came to be understood literally because of a "disease of language".

The first English translation of Dupuis was published at Bristol in 1840 under the title The True Origin, Object, and Organization of the Christian Religion. It was followed by four London editions: Was Christ a Person or the Sun? (1857), Christianity a Form of the Great Solar Myth (1870), On the Connection of Christianity with Solar Worship (1877), and Natural Religion; or, The Secret of All the Creeds (1908).

In the United States, Dupuis was translated at New Orleans in 1872.

At the beginning of the twentieth century, Dupuis's arguments concerning the Christians' "Sun-God" were revived by John M. Robertson, a leading advocate of the Christ myth theory, and by the writer Edward Carpenter.

The historian of science Giorgio de Santillana cited Dupuis in the preface to Hamlet's Mill (1969), explaining that his reading of The Origin of All Religious Worship had been the starting point for his reflections on mythology.

== Reception in Europe ==
=== France ===
The ideas that Dupuis published in the Journal des Savants began to circulate during the 1780s. Among those they influenced were Antoine-François Delandine, and Jean-Paul Rabaut Saint-Étienne.

In 1791, Volney, in the concluding chapters of The Ruins, became the first author explicitly to defend the Christ myth theory, arguing that Christianity was an "allegorical worship of the Sun". He cited Dupuis in the notes to his work. That same year, François Henri Stanislas Delaulnaye proposed a similar interpretation in his Histoire générale et particulière des religions.

Dupuis's influence is also evident in a passage of Nicolas de Condorcet's Sketch for a Historical Picture of the Progress of the Human Mind (1794), written after Condorcet had recommended to King Frederick the Great that Dupuis be appointed professor in Berlin.

Among other works inspired by Dupuis before the publication of The Origin of All Religious Worship was The Fable of Christ Unveiled, published anonymously in 1794 and sometimes attributed to Sylvain Maréchal.

==== Echoes in the Republican Press ====
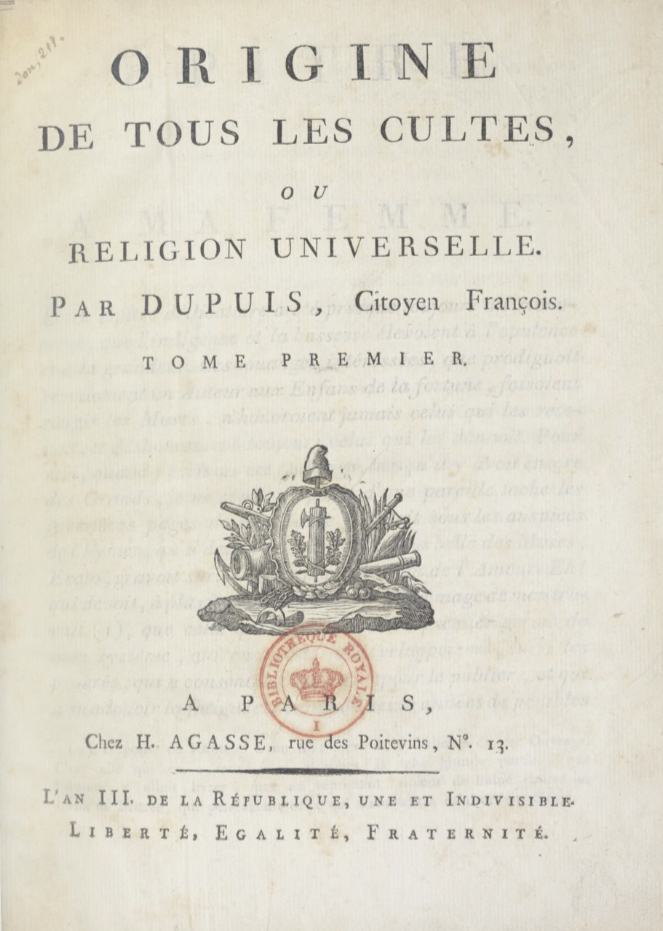
Title page of the first volume (1795).

The publication of The Origin of All Religious Worship was announced in the Gazette nationale, owned by Dupuis's publisher, Henri Agasse. During the following months, the work was reviewed in several moderate republican newspapers, including La Sentinelle, by Jean-Baptiste Louvet de Couvray, Dupuis's colleague in the Council of Five Hundred.

In La Décade philosophique, Pierre-Louis Ginguené devoted a series of four articles published between January and May 1796 to review what he called "one of the most important works to have appeared in modern times, since it tears away – or entirely lifts – the veil covering the fictions of the ancient world." While highly complimentary regarding its substance, Ginguené criticized its presentation, describing it as "this voluminous production... burdened with exhausting erudition, lacking order and method, and not written as a work of such importance ought to have been." Indeed, The Origin of All Religious Worship consists of a succession of disparate texts marked by frequent repetitions.

A review also appeared in the Mercure français, likewise owned by Henri Agasse, in the form of three anonymous letters addressed to a subscriber. Once again, the reviewer expressed strong approval of Dupuis's ideas while regretting the work's "general disorder" and numerous repetitions, which hindered the reader.

==== Early Catholic Responses ====
As early as 1792, Abbé Lefranc, a refractory priest had undertaken to refute the arguments of Dupuis and Volney in his work Conjuration contre la religion catholique et les souverains.

Within the Constitutional Church, the publication of The Origin of All Religious Worship likewise attracted attention. In December 1795, Claude Le Coz, Bishop of Rennes, expressed his concern in a letter to Abbé Grégoire, Bishop of Blois.

Early in 1796, the Annales religieuses, politiques et littéraires, a periodical associated with the refractory clergy, warned its readers that The Origin of All Religious Worship "might prove a dangerous lure... especially for inexperienced young people who would swallow the poison of unbelief mixed with more agreeable nourishment." The journal regretted that Dupuis had not confined himself "to developing the happy and original idea of explaining, through physics and astronomy, the fables and mysteries of idolatry," instead of attacking Christianity.

A few months later, the Dominican friar Bernard Lambert published the first full-scale rebuttal of Dupuis's work.

In his Memoirs Illustrating the History of Jacobinism, published in London between 1797 and 1798, Abbé Barruel listed Dupuis among the "blasphemers" whom he accused of contributing to the overthrow of both the Church and the monarchy.

==== The Abrégé ====
In late summer 1798, in order to make his ideas accessible to a wider audience, Charles-François Dupuis published an Abrégé de l'origine de tous les cultes (Abridgement of The Origin of All Religious Worship). The French Directory financed its printing and paid the author for the work. The Abrégé enjoyed great commercial success and was adopted as a textbook in the Écoles centrales.

In his Paris Journal, the Prussian linguist Wilhelm von Humboldt, who associated with the Idéologues, records having attended, on 25 August 1798, a lecture in which Dupuis expounded his system for interpreting religions. At the beginning of 1799, the leading Idéologue Antoine Destutt de Tracy published a series of four articles in the Mercure français.

==== Under Napoleon ====
After the Concordat of 1801, concluded with the Holy See, newspapers – now heavily censored by the regime of Napoleon Bonaparte – ceased to discuss Dupuis's writings, while the Écoles centrales, considered too heavily imbued with revolutionary ideas, were closed. Catholic instruction was reintroduced into public education.

At Valenciennes, a small book which adopted Dupuis's principal arguments, was publicly burned by local priests. On 18 October 1802, the Prefect of the Nord ordered the work to be banned, declaring that "at a time when the government is employing all its efforts to restore the practice of the Christian religion in France... the work in question can only be regarded as a bold attempt to provoke opposition and resistance to the salutary laws concerning the free exercise of religion."

The spectacular success of The Genius of Christianity (1802), amplified by official propaganda, reflected this conservative turn. In his Memoirs from Beyond the Grave, François-René de Chateaubriand recalled the publication of his apologetic work:

"...what hope could I have, I who was unknown and had no advocates, of destroying the influence of Voltaire, which had dominated for more than half a century – of Voltaire, who had erected the immense edifice completed by the Encyclopedists and consolidated by all the celebrated men of Europe? What! Were Diderot, d'Alembert, Duclos, Dupuis, Helvétius, and Condorcet minds without authority? Was the world to return to the Golden Legend, renouncing its admiration for the masterpieces of science and reason? ... Was it not as ridiculous as it was rash for an obscure man to oppose a philosophical movement so irresistible that it had produced the Revolution?"

In the Memoirs, Chateaubriand also recounts his first meeting with Napoleon on 22 April 1802. Napoleon remarked:

"Christianity? Did not the Ideologues seek to reduce it to a system of astronomy? Even if that were so, do they imagine they thereby diminish Christianity? If Christianity is the allegory of the movement of the spheres, the geometry of the heavens, then, despite themselves, these so-called free thinkers have still left enough grandeur to the infamous thing."

The Idéologues, who had supported the Coup of 18 Brumaire, soon fell from favour. In 1802, Napoleon removed several of them from the legislative assemblies, and Dupuis himself retired from political life.

In this increasingly hostile climate, the Idéologue senator Antoine Destutt de Tracy republished in 1804 his Analyse raisonnée de l'origine de tous les cultes (Analytical Summary of The Origin of All Religious Worship), concluding:

"I shall have achieved my purpose if I have inspired the desire to read it, and if I have convinced the reader – as I am convinced myself – that few books are as learned, as curious, and as useful as his; that its reputation will continue to grow, and that it will mark an epoch in the history of the human mind. (Note: According to Destutt de Tracy, the work offered the problem of the origin of religions "so complete and well-founded a solution that the matter is settled once and for all." He regarded it as evidence of the "immense superiority" of the moderns, who were capable of demystifying, in retrospect, the childish beliefs of the ancients.) Already a great epoch was the moment when such a doctrine could be published without fear of authority."

Toward the end of his life, Dupuis completed a major comparative study of cosmogonies, which was intended for publication by Henri Agasse. Fearing, however, that the work would offend the government, he ultimately chose to suppress it himself. After his death in 1809, the manuscript passed into the hands of Volney and Destutt de Tracy, who eventually abandoned plans to publish it. It has since been lost.

==== Legacy ====
In his Mémoire sur la science de l'homme ("Memoir on the Science of Man"), published towards the end of the Empire in 1813, Henri de Saint-Simon paid tribute to Dupuis, who had "demonstrated beyond all doubt, in his work on the origin of religions, that all known religions have been founded upon the scientific system, and that every reorganization of the scientific system necessarily entails the reorganization and improvement of the religious system."

Dupuis's Treatise on the Mysteries foreshadows the Saint-Simonian idea that scientists, forming an enlightened vanguard in the service of the people, should constitute a new priesthood by assuming the spiritual authority formerly exercised by the Church.

The Holy See placed The Origin of All Religious Worship on the Index Librorum Prohibitorum in July 1818.

During the reigns of Louis XVIII and Charles X of France, the work – and especially its abridgement, sometimes reduced to the chapter on Christianity alone – circulated among republican and anticlerical opponents, particularly in student circles. The son of the revolutionary Gracchus Babeuf republished it in 1822. That same year, the Paris bookseller Adolphe Chassériau was convicted, both at trial and on appeal, for reprinting the Abrégé. The court ordered that all copies be "seized and torn up."

The Prefect of Police of Paris ordered "every bookseller displaying merchandise on the public highway to remove any book or work of art contrary to the law or dangerous to public morals." Stendhal, who owned a Belgian edition of the Abrégé in his library (Note: The philologist Michael Nerlich argued that The Charterhouse of Parma, particularly its account of the Battle of Waterloo, contains echoes of The Origin of All Religious Worship.) (the book was published five times in Brussels during the 1820s), replied in Le Courrier français that Parisian booksellers "will henceforth be able to offer the public only what it stubbornly refuses to buy."

Thirty years after the publication of The Origin of All Religious Worship, despite the Church's condemnation and official censorship, Dupuis's ideas continued to command authority among a broad readership. Benjamin Constant lamented this state of affairs in his treatise on the history of religion (1824), writing: "No one has carried subtlety and audacity ... as far as the man who seems to have settled opinion in France on this subject, and for whom all the gods and heroes ... were nothing but the sun and the stars." Constant argued that "the refined doctrines of the priests", which are overrepresented in the surviving ancient sources, concerned only a tiny minority of the population, since "popular religion was for the people the only religion." He added: "The history of the gods is the history of nature only for those who have studied nature. The multitude does not study it."

In 1827, Jean-Baptiste Pérès published a satirical refutation of Dupuis's Christ myth theory, arguing that the same method could equally "prove" that the life of Napoleon Bonaparte, like that of Jesus, was merely a "solar fable" devoid of any historical foundation. This strategy of discrediting an argument through irony was not new. It had already been employed in 1780, (the House of Bourbon and the Twelve Peers of France symbolizing the moist earth and the zodiac). In 1796, a newspaper likewise pushed allegorical interpretation to absurd extremes in order to ridicule Dupuis and Volney.

In a similar vein, Johann Friedrich Rochlitz recounted an anecdote told to him by Christoph Martin Wieland. During Napoleon's visit to Weimar for the Congress of Erfurt in October 1808, the Emperor said to the poet: "I do not believe at all that a certain Mr Christ ever existed." Wieland replied: "Sire, I believe so too, and next year, I shall no longer believe that a certain Napoleon ever existed." Napoleon, laughing heartily, answered: "Good, very good!"

During the July Monarchy, Dupuis's work circulated widely in revolutionary circles. Jean-Jacques Pillot, one of the organizers of the first communist banquet at Belleville in 1841, invoked Dupuis in La Tribune du Peuple, which the young Karl Marx read during his stay in Paris.

Auguste Comte, like Saint-Simon, whose secretary he had been in his youth, had read The Origin of All Religious Worship. Although, in his Course of Positive Philosophy, he advanced a thesis opposed to Dupuis's – holding that astral worship represented the final stage of fetishism - Comte shared Dupuis's rejection of metaphysics (the law of three stages). His attempt to establish an immanent Religion of Humanity, inspired by the revolutionary secular religion, emphasized the cult of the dead and, consequently, of the nation (Dupuis himself had been involved in the creation of the Panthéon in Paris). Likewise, Comte's Positivist calendar echoed the French Republican calendar.

During the French Third Republic, Dupuis's work remained an important intellectual reference among the radical and anticlerical left. In 1903, while the government of Émile Combes was secularizing public education and preparing the law on the Separation of the Churches and the State, the historian Alphonse Aulard wrote in L'Aurore: "It was because Dupuis's works were anti-religious that the bourgeoisie admired them so greatly around 1825; and it was for precisely the same reason that it consigned them to oblivion around 1855 ... from the time when it allied itself with the Church against democracy, that is, from the Second Republic onward."

Alphonse Aulard regarded this oblivion as a "concerted punishment". The numerous criticisms levelled by Christian authors throughout the nineteenth century ultimately resulted, in his view, in a form of damnatio memoriae affecting Dupuis.

Besides the now outdated character of his astral reductionism, the polemical nature of Dupuis's work, long employed as anticlerical propaganda, contributed to its loss of standing among scholars. In a lecture delivered in 1907, the Protestant theologian Jean Réville, professor of the history of religions at the Collège de France, described The Origin of All Religious Worship as "the supreme manifestation of the tendency to use the history of religions as an arsenal of arguments against Christianity."

Another leading scholar in the field, the Jesuit Henri Pinard de La Boullaye, professor of the history of religions at the Pontifical Gregorian University in Rome, reproduced the frontispiece of The Origin of All Religious Worship at the beginning of the first volume of Comparative Studies of Religions (1922) to illustrate "the fantasies to which a systematic cast of mind and the abuse of allegory may lead."

=== Germany ===
Four years after Dupuis's first articles appeared in the Journal des savants, the physicist Christian Ernst Wünsch, professor at the University of Frankfurt, drew inspiration from the French author's theories in his anonymously published book Horus (1783). This "astrognostic" pamphlet was publicly burned in Leipzig.

In 1788, the Memoir on the Origin of the Constellations was translated into German at Regensburg by the philologist and mathematician Johann Philipp Ostertag.

Dupuis's ideas influenced a number of German-speaking authors during the early nineteenth century, notably Georg Friedrich Creuzer, who observed that "most writers copy him more readily than they cite him." (Note: Julien Danielo, a former secretary to François-René de Chateaubriand, considered "the influence exercised by this work upon the scholars beyond the Rhine" to be remarkable. He detected Dupuis's influence, for example, in the writings of Joseph Görres.)

According to Pierre Leroux: "The Hegelian philosophy of religion, despite its terminology, Creuzer's Symbolik, and a host of other works produced in Germany are, in certain respects, nothing more than imitations of Dupuis's system, somewhat less narrow than that system itself, but nevertheless proceeding from the same assumption that the religions of antiquity derived exclusively from nature, external phenomena, physics, and the senses..."

There is, however, no evidence of a direct influence on Hegel. It is only known, as Jacques D'Hondt has shown, that Hegel was influenced by his reading of Volney, who himself had drawn inspiration from Dupuis.

The first German translation of The Origin of All Religious Worship appeared at Stuttgart in 1839 in response to David Strauss's The Life of Jesus, Critically Examined, the founding text of the Young Hegelians. Strauss's historicist approach to the Gospels was criticized by Bruno Bauer, who defended the Christ myth theory from 1840 onward, though without adopting the astronomical interpretation – unlike Johann Nepomuk Sepp in 1843, who employed it for apologetic purposes.

Arnold Ruge, another leading figure among the Young Hegelians, wrote in 1869: "How is it possible that Dupuis's Origin of All Religious Worship has fallen so completely into oblivion? Have the liberal theologians Strauss and Renan not read it? And why did Feuerbach not likewise take Christian dogma literally on the astronomical plane? I do not doubt that he knew Dupuis; but the spirit of the age had, since the 1790s, once again become so obscured beneath the veil of superstition that it was already considered a bold act merely to emphasize the human truth of Christianity. As for its natural meaning, no one yet dared venture there." This suggestion – that Feuerbach knew Dupuis's work but did not dare follow him in The Essence of Christianity – was later disputed by the Germanist Albert Lévy.

A new German translation, published in Leipzig in 1910, reflected a renewed interest in Dupuis's theories. That same year, two advocates of the Christ myth theory, Arthur Drews and Andrzej Niemojewski, paid tribute to his work.

Responding to the intense debates over the historicity of Jesus sparked in Germany by Arthur Drews's publications, the theologian Albert Schweitzer argued in the enlarged 1913 edition of The Quest of the Historical Jesus that, although The Origin of All Religious Worship was "a monument of the first rank in cultural history", "from the standpoint of scholarship and the history of religions it exercised no lasting influence."

=== Italy ===
In 1801, a translation of a chapter from Dupuis's Treatise on the Mysteries was published in Milan as an appendix to an edition of Volney's Ruins. Entitled Esame filosofico de' misteri, it was presented as an ideal means of instilling "sound principles, love of country, liberty, virtue, and glory, without which there can never be a republic." The following year, another translation appeared, this time of the chapter of The Origin of All Religious Worship devoted to Christianity, under the title Origine astronomico-fisica della religione cristiana. As with the Treatise on the Mysteries, the anonymous translator made numerous alterations to Dupuis's original text.

These first two translations coincided with the signing of the Concordat of 1801 between the French First Republic and the Holy See, marking the abandonment of the revolutionary policy of de-Christianization. They originated within a network of Italian democrats – including Ugo Foscolo, Carlo Lauberg, and Vincenzo Cuoco – who maintained close ties with the French Idéologues.

After the end of the French occupation of Italy, The Origin of All Religious Worship continued to circulate among republican exiles and within certain Masonic networks. The rituals of the secret society of the Sublimi Maestri Perfetti, founded by Philippe Buonarroti in 1818, drew inspiration from it, while Marcello Reghellini, then living in Brussels, referred to it in The Spirit of the Doctrine of Freemasonry.

The poet Giacomo Leopardi recorded in his Zibaldone, under the date of 19 March 1825, that he had read, in French, the fourth chapter of the Abrégé. Reflecting on fear as the foundation of religious practice, he wrote: "As nearly all peoples have acknowledged two principles, two kinds of divinities, the one good and beneficent, the other evil and maleficent, the most savage peoples have directed, or still direct, their worship entirely or principally toward the latter, some even considering them more powerful than the former; whereas the more civilized peoples, like the Greeks in the myth of the Giants, have supposed the evil principle to have been conquered and subjected by the good." Dupuis himself, however, did not draw such a distinction between "savage" peoples worshipping malevolent deities and "civilized" peoples devoted to a beneficent principle.

Following its inclusion on the Index Librorum Prohibitorum, the work was banned throughout the Italian kingdoms and the Papal States – copies were, for example, confiscated in Genoa in 1840 – but it continued to circulate clandestinely through Mazzinian networks, particularly from Marseille.

Two Italian translations of the Abrégé were published in Florence and Ferrara in the early 1860s.

=== Elsewhere ===
A Spanish version of the Abrégé was published by José Marchena in 1820. Extracts from the work were also translated into Portuguese (1913) and Greek (1979).

== Bibliography ==
- Pauvros, Céline (2013). La raison et la nation : Charles-François Dupuis (1742–1809), historien des religions et républicain : itinéraire social, politique et intellectuel d'un philosophe à la fin des Lumières [Reason and the Nation: Charles-François Dupuis (1742–1809), Historian of Religions and Republican: The Social, Political, and Intellectual Trajectory of a Philosopher in the Late Enlightenment] (PhD thesis in history). École des hautes études en sciences sociales.
