= Hierophylakes =

Priests for the Eumolpidae

Hierophylakes, also known as hierodidaskaloi, hieronomoi, or hierophantai, were priests for the Eumolpidae involved in performing acts of sacrifice.

Pausanias stated that new hierophantai were elected every quadrennial, and so individuals did not maintain an existence within this role for their life-time. He also stated that they might marry if they wished to do so known as, lambanein gynaika.

They are also mentioned in the HGK 1 inscription, an important component of the state calendar created in Kos about 360 B.C. which lists the officials present at sacrifices. The Hierophylakes alongside an archeuontes are noted to make a preliminary announcement before the sacrifice of an oxen.

The Hierophylakes as a role is also mentioned during the early Roman Empire in a votive inscription to Tiberius and Livia.

== See also ==
- Hierophant
