= Chaeremon of Alexandria =

Stoic philosopher, historian, and grammarian (1st century CE)

- Χαιρήμων ὁ Ἀλεξανδρεύς
- Born: c. 1st century AD
- Died: before 96 AD
- Occupation: Ancient Egyptian priest

Philosophical work
- Era: Ancient Roman philosophy
- Region: Roman Alexandria
- School: Stoicism
- Institutions: Mouseion
- Language: Ancient Greek
- Main interests: Ancient Egyptian religion

Chaeremon of Alexandria (/kəˈriːmən, -mɒn/; Ancient Greek: Χαιρήμων ὁ Ἀλεξανδρεύς, gen.: Ancient Greek: Χαιρήμονος; fl. 1st century AD) was a Stoic philosopher and historian who wrote on Egyptian mythology from a "typically Stoic" perspective.

== Biography ==
According to the Suda, he was the head of the Alexandrian school of grammarians, and he may also have been head of the Museion. He was probably one of the ambassadors to Caligula from Alexandria in 40 AD. He also taught Nero, probably before 49 AD when Seneca the Younger became Nero's tutor. He may have been the grandson of the Chaeremon who accompanied the Roman prefect Aelius Gallus on his tour of Egypt in 26 AD. His father – about whom nothing is known – was called Leonidas, and he was probably born no later than 10 AD.

One of the poems from Martial's eleventh book of Epigrams mocks Chaeremon; as Martial did not usually attack living figures Chaeremon presumably died before 96 AD when Epigrams XI was published.

== Works ==
All of Chaeremon's works are lost, though a number of fragments are quoted by later authors. Three titles are preserved: the History of Egypt, Hieroglyphika, and On Comets, with another fragment quoted from an unknown grammatical treatise of his.

Josephus quotes an extensive fragment from Chaeremon's Egyptian history, in which he scornfully recounts and ridicules, in a manner similar to that of Manetho, the departure of the Jews from Egypt. Josephus boasts of having refuted Chaeremon as well as Manetho and others. Chaeremon's history is also mentioned by Porphyry. Chaeremon's description of Egypt recalls the ideas which Philo, Clement, Origen, and others introduced into the Old and the New Testament. The asceticism especially, which he ascribes to the ancient Egyptian priests, is analogous to the description in Philo's work, "De Vita Contemplativa"; still there is no literary connection between the two authors. Fragments of the "History of Egypt" may still exist in a treatise of Psellus published in 1877.

According to the Suda, another work of Chaeremon was entitled "Hieroglyphica," and probably contained interpretations of the hieroglyphics while a third work may be the book "On the Comets" mentioned by Origen. Origen also made use of other writings of Chaeremon that are now lost.

== Editions and Translations ==
- P. Charvet, S. Aufrère, J-M. Kowalski, A. Zucker, Le Quartette d'Alexandrie - Hérodote, Diodore, Strabon, Chérémon, Collection Bouquins, Paris, 2021, (1563 p). Aufrère provides a translation of a fictional text, Chaeremon's Book of Phtomyris or Critics des Aigyptiaka, a literary exercise imagined as a response to classical authors Herodotus, Diodorus, and Strabo.
- van der Horst, Pieter Willem (1987). Chaeremon: Egyptian Priest and Stoic Philosopher. Leiden: Brill.. Pieter van der Horst includes 14 certain and 14 doubtful fragments in his edition of Chaeramon's works.
