= Daduchos =

Epithet of Artemis

Daduchos or Daduchus, or Dadouchos (/dəˈdjuːkəs/; Ancient Greek: δᾳδοῦχος "torch-bearer", from δᾶις+ἔχω) is an epithet of Artemis, and notably of Demeter seeking her lost daughter (Persephone) with a torch. It was also an epithet of Hekate, a goddess frequently associated with torches. This title was given in the Rhodes Island in Greece. It was also the title of the second priest (ranking after the Hierophant) at the Eleusinian Mysteries, an office inherited in several families of Athens.

== Sources ==
- Eleusis By Karl Kerényi Archetypal Image of Mother and Daughter Page 78 ISBN 0-691-01915-0
