= Henri Agasse =

French publisher and editor

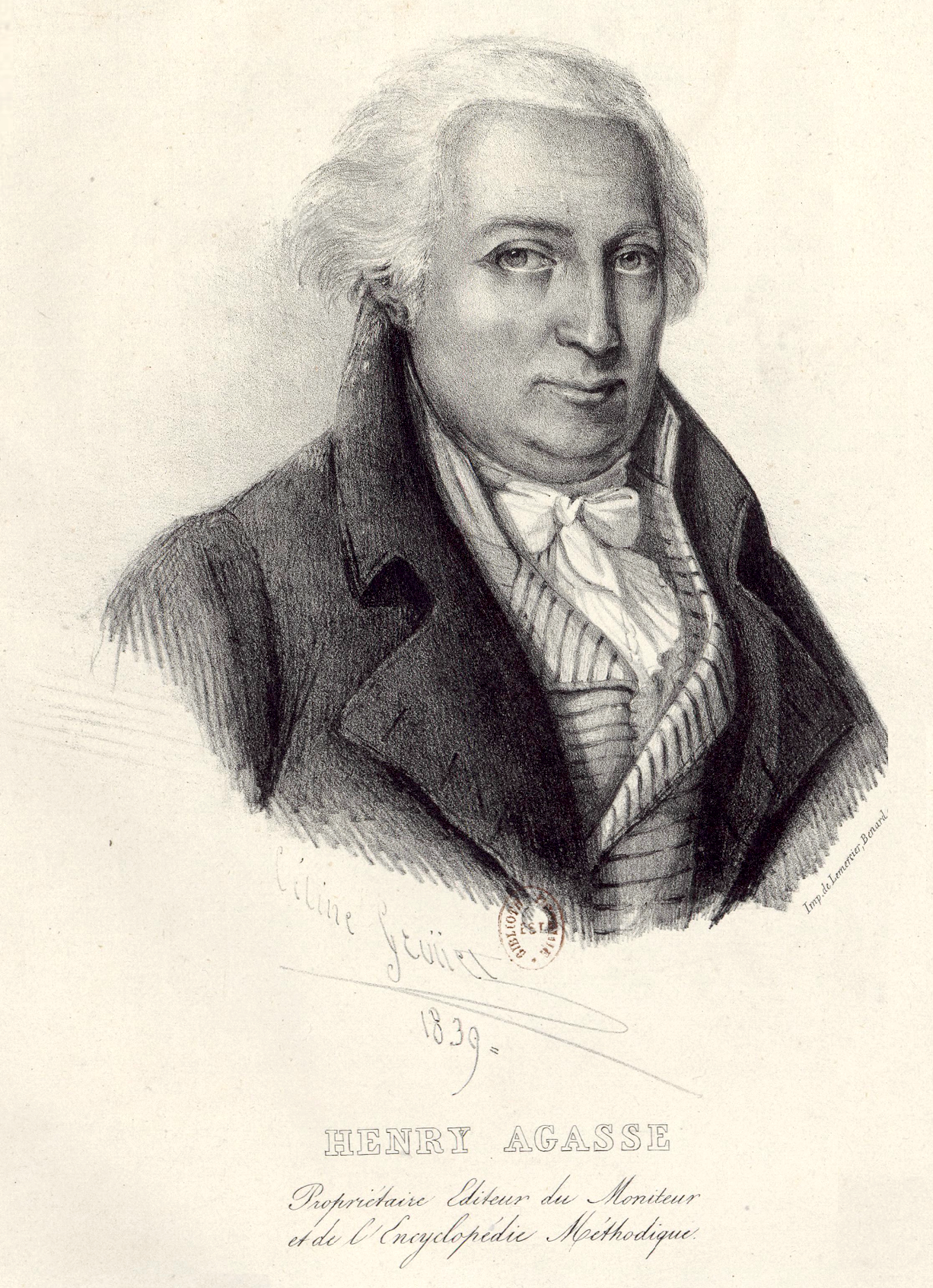
- Born: 14 April 1752; Paris
- Died: 1 May 1813 (aged 61); Paris
- Occupation(s): Publisher; Editor

Henri Agasse (14 April 1752 – 1 May 1813), was a French publisher and editor, associated with Charles-Joseph Panckoucke.

== Biography ==
The son of Guillaume Agasse, lord of Maurevert and Cresne, accounts clerk of the royal household and chamber and the Chevalier de Maurevert, in 1787 he married Antoinette Pauline Panckoucke, daughter of the editor Charles-Joseph Panckoucke. A privy-counsellor to the House and Crown of France, he was himself an Officer of the Goblets of the King's Household and a citizen of Paris.

In 1794, the latter associated him with the development of the family publishing house and the involved him in maintaining the Lisle bookstore following the death of Placide Panckoucke in 1800.

Agasse became the owner of his father-in-law's Encyclopédie méthodique and of Le Moniteur universel.

His publishing house was located in Paris from (1790-1813) at number 12 rue Pavée and at numbers 13, 18, and 6 rue des Poitevins.

Politically, he was a member of the first electoral assembly of Paris, held at the beginning of October 1790 and he was licensed as a printer 1 April 1811.

On his death, his widow was licensed to succeed him as printer on 11 May 1813.

== Succession ==
His nephew Henry Agasse de Cresne was a notary from 1810 to 1837 and a shareholder of the Bank of France. He was involved in the recovery after 1847 of the maison Panckoucke (lost by Charles-Louis-Fleury Panckoucke) and he lived in a chateau near Melun. At his death, his estate was evaluated at more than 3.5 million.
