= Encyclopédie Méthodique =

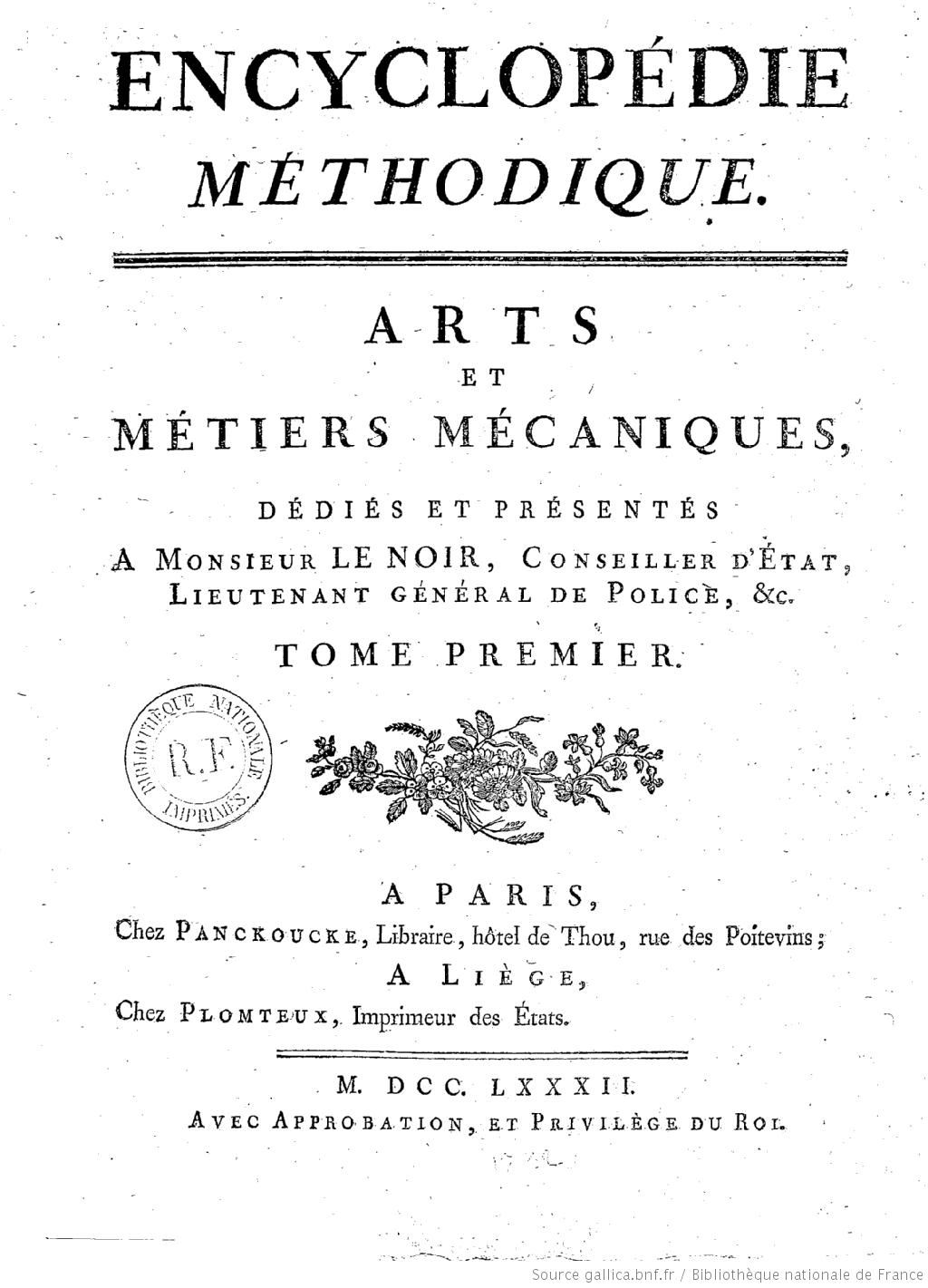
First page of the Encyclopédie méthodique published in 1782 (Panckoucke, Paris)

The Encyclopédie méthodique par ordre des matières (lit. 'Methodical Encyclopedia by Order of Subject Matter') was published between 1782 and 1832 by the French publisher Charles Joseph Panckoucke, his son-in-law Henri Agasse, and the latter's wife, Thérèse-Charlotte Agasse. Arranged by disciplines, it was a revised and much expanded version, in roughly 210 to 216 volumes (different sets were bound differently), of the alphabetically arranged Encyclopédie, edited by Denis Diderot and Jean le Rond d'Alembert. The full title was L'Encyclopédie méthodique ou par ordre de matières par une société de gens de lettres, de savants et d'artistes; précédée d'un vocabulaire universel, servant de table pour tout l'ouvrage, ornée des portraits de MM. Diderot et d'Alembert, premiers éditeurs de l'Encyclopédie.

== Development ==
Two sets of Diderot's Encyclopédie and its supplements were cut up into articles. Each subject category was entrusted to a specialized editor, whose job was to collect all articles relating to his subject and exclude those belonging to others. Great care was to be taken of those articles that were of a doubtful nature, which were not to be omitted. For certain topics, such as air (which belonged equally to chemistry, physics and medicine), the methodical arrangement had the unexpected effect of breaking up a single article into several parts. Each volume was to have its own introduction, a table of contents, and a history of the Encyclopédie. The whole work was to be linked together by a Vocabulaire universel (Vol. 1 – 4), with references to all locations where each word appears.

The prospectus, issued early in 1782, proposed three editions, each with seven volumes of 250 to 300 plates:

- 84 volumes;
- 43 volumes, with 3 columns per page; and
- 53 volumes of about 100 sheets, with 2 columns per page.

Subscription was priced at:

- 672 livres from the March 15 to July 1782
- 751 livres from August 1782 to March 1783; and
- 888 livres after April 1783.

The livraisons (home-deliveries) were to be in two volumes each, the first (Jurisprudence, Vol. 1; Literature, Vol. 1,) to appear in July 1782, and the whole to be finished by 1787. The number of subscribers, 4072, was so great that the subscription list for the price of 672 livres was closed on April 30. Twenty-five printing offices were employed, and in November 1782, the first livraison (Jurisprudence, Vol. 1; and half volume each of Arts et métiers and Histoire naturelle) was issued.

A Spanish prospectus was sent out and obtained 330 Spanish subscribers, with the inquisitor-general at their head.

The complaints of the subscribers and his own heavy advances of over 150,000 livres induced Panckoucke, in November 1788, to appeal to the authors to finish the work. Those who were behind made new contracts, giving their word of honor to put their parts to press by 1788, so that Panckoucke hoped to finish the whole, including the Vocabulaire universel (4 or 5 vols.) by 1792.

Entire topics such as architecture, engineering, hunting, police, and games had been overlooked in the prospectus. A new division was made in 44 parts, to contain 51 dictionaries, and about 124 volumes. Permission was obtained on February 27, 1789, to receive subscriptions for separate dictionaries. Two thousand subscribers were lost in the French Revolution.

The 50th livraison appeared on July 23, 1792, by which time all the dictionaries eventually published had been begun except for seven: Jeux familiers and mathématiques, physics, Art oratoire, physical geography, Chasses and Pèches. On the other hand, eighteen volumes were now finished: Mathématics, games, surgery, ancient and modern geography, history, theology, logic, grammar, jurisprudence, finance, political economy, commerce, marine, military science, academic art, arts and crafts, and Encyclopédiana. Of the three parts of Assemblée Nationale:

- the History of the Revolution;
- Debates; and
- Laws and Decrees;

only volume 2, i.e. "Debates", appeared in 1792, with 804 pages (Absens to Aurillac). Supplements were added to military art in 1797, and to history in 1807, but not to any of the other 16, despite many changes in knowledge by 1832.

The publication was continued by Henri Agasse, Panckoucke's son-in-law, from 1794 to 1813, and then by the latter's widow, Mme Agasse, until 1832, when it was completed in 102 livraisons or 337 parts, forming roughly 166½ volumes of text (depending on how the parts were bound) as well as 51 illustrated parts containing 6,439 plates. The number of pages totalled 124,210 pages, of which 5,458 pages were plates. To save money, the plates belonging to architecture were not published. Pharmacy (separated from chemistry), minerals, education, Ponts et chausses were not published as had been announced.

Many dictionaries have a classed index of articles. The one in Oeconomie politique is an excellent example, giving the contents of each article, so that any passage can be found easily.

When "completed", the encyclopedia suffered at least one great weakness. As the Vocabulaire Universel, the key and index to the entire work, was not published, it was difficult to carry out any research or to find all the articles on any particular subject. The original parts had often been subdivided, and had been so added onto by other dictionaries, supplements, and appendices that an exact account could not be given of the work, which contained 88 alphabets, 83 indexes, 166 introductions, discourses, prefaces, etc. Overall, probably no more an unmanageable body of dictionaries has ever been published, except Jacques Paul Migne's Encyclopédie théologique, Paris, 1844–1875, with 168 volumes, 101 dictionaries, and 119,059 pages.

The Encyclopédie méthodique par ordre des matières occupied a thousand workers in production, and 2,250 contributors.

== Translations ==
Ten volumes of a Spanish translation with a volume of plates were published at Madrid in 1806:

- Historia natural, Vol. 1–2
- Grammatica, Vol. 1
- Arte militar, Vol. 1–2
- Geografia, Vol. 1–3
- Fabricas, Vol. 1–2
- Plates, Vol. 1

A French edition was printed at Padua, with the plates, very carefully engraved.

== Details of encyclopedia format ==
The division adopted was:

01. Mathematics
02. Physics
03. Medicine
04. Anatomy and Physiology
05. Surgery
06. Chemistry, metallurgy and pharmacy
07. Agriculture
08. Natural history of animals (Zoology), in six parts
09. Botany
10. Minerals
11. Physical geography
12. Ancient and modern geography
13. Antiquities

14. History
15. Theology
16. Philosophy
17. Metaphysics, logic and morality
18. Grammar and literature
19. Law
20. Finance
21. Political economy
22. Commerce
23. Marine
24. Art militaire
25. Fine arts
26. Arts and crafts

The largest dictionaries were:

- Zoology: 13,645 pages, 1206 plates (7 vols.);
- Botany: 12,002 pages, 1,000 plates (34 only of cryptogamic plants);
- Medicine: 10,330 pages (13 vols.);
- Geography: 9,090 pages, 193 maps and plates (3 vols. and 2 atlases);
- Jurisprudence (with police and municipalities): 7,607 pages (10 vols.); and
- Anatomy (not a dictionary but a series of systematic treatises): 2,866 pages (4 vols.).

== Partial list of contributors ==
- Jean Guillaume Audinet-Serville (insects)
- Pierre Joseph Bonnaterre (cetaceans, mammals, birds, reptiles, amphibians, and insects)
- Jean-Nicolas Démeunier (U.S.)
- Antoine-François Fourcroy (insects)
- Félix Édouard Guérin-Méneville (insects)
- Jean Baptiste Godart (insects)
- Christian Hee Hwass (molluscs)
- Thomas Jefferson (U.S.)
- Jean-Baptiste Lamarck (botany)
- Philippe Petit-Radel (surgery)
- Philippe-Isidore Picot de Lapeyrouse (birds)
- Guillaume-Antoine Olivier (insects)
- Pierre André Latreille (invertebrates, insects)
- Amédée Louis Michel le Peletier, comte de Saint-Fargeau (insects)
- Louis-Bernard Guyton de Morveau (chemistry)
- Antoine Chrysostome Quatremère de Quincy (architecture)
- Jean-Marie Roland, vicomte de la Platière (commerce)
- Jacques de Sève artwork
- Jacques-André Naigeon
