= Antoine Banier =

French historian (1673–1741)

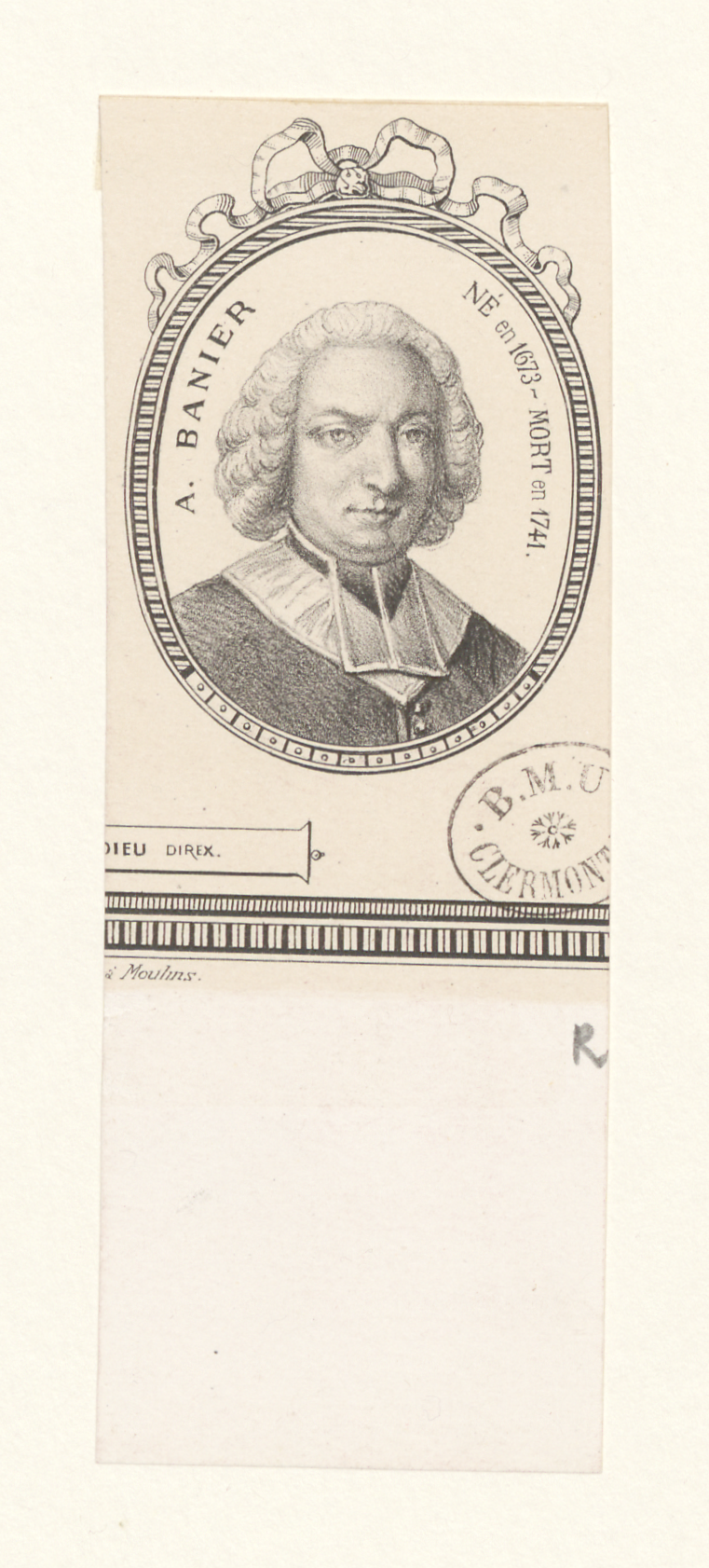
Antoine Banier

The abbé Antoine Banier (2 November 1673 – 2 November 1741), a French clergyman and member of the Académie des Inscriptions et Belles-Lettres from 1713, was a historian and translator, whose rationalizing interpretation of Greek mythology was widely accepted until the mid-nineteenth century.

== Early life and education ==
Banier, born at Dallet in Auvergne and educated at the Jesuit college at Clermont, arrived in Paris as a young man and held a place as tutor to the children of président Dumetz.

== Mythologie et la fable expliqués par l'histoire ==
In his Mythologie et la fable expliqués par l'histoire (1711, recast in dialogue form in 1715, enthusiastically received and often reprinted) he offered a frankly Euhemerist reading of the origins of Greek mythology, seen as the gradually deified accounts of actual personages (see Euhemerism). The Advertisement to the English translation of Banier's Ovid summarised his procedure:

For Mr. Banier hath renounced the common Method of treating Fables as mere Allegories, and hath proved, that they have their FOUNDATION in REAL HISTORY, and contain many important Facts. He hath most judiciously stripped them of their poetical Embelishments and Disguises, and reduced them to the plain Historical Truths which the first Poets found them."

Banier's Christian context placed these myths firmly in the tradition of idolatry, the worship of false gods.

== Ovid's Metamorphoses: translation and illustrations ==
For his translation of Ovid's Metamorphoses he wrote a preface. An edition with Ovid's Latin and an English translation of Banier on facing pages, was published first in 1717, with a preface by Dr Sir Samuel Garth and handsome illustrations by Bernard Picart. This was the form in which most eighteenth-century British readers without Latin approached Ovid:

It will perhaps at first sight appear Pedantic, that a Book, which by its Magnificence and Price can only be intended for a Court and for Persons of the first Quality, should be half filled with Latin. But how many are there of so elevated a Rank, especially among the English Nobility, who can relish the Beauties of the Original?

The engravings took up a career independent of the text; they formed part of the extensive visual repertory of prints and illustrated books that was assembled at the Manufactory of Meissen porcelain, for the use of porcelain painters in the rococo style, and they remained useful as a source of inspiration into the neoclassical nineteenth century, for a copy appears in the 1824 sale catalogue of Benjamin Vulliamy, the neoclassical clockmaker and bronzefounder to George IV.

== Histoire générale des cérémonies, moeurs, et coutumes religieuses de tous les peuples du monde ==
In the ambitious Histoire générale des cérémonies, moeurs, et coutumes religieuses de tous les peuples du monde, in seven volumes (Paris, 1741), for which the engravings had been supplied by the late Bernard Picart, Banier and his collaborator, the abbé Jean-Baptiste Le Mascrier, aimed to describe all religions of the known world, their origins and doctrines and especially their rites: "It reflects in content and tone the learning, urbanity and self-confidence of the Catholic Church of the Ancien Régime," the producers of a lavish modern facsimile have termed it. In the work, Banier and Le Mascrier were in fact revising and enlarging an earlier Cérémonies et coutumes religieuses de tous les peoples du monde, which had been compiled by the satirical Huguenot writer and printer, Jean-Frédéric Bernard (died 1752) and printed from the safety of Amsterdam, in 1723-24. Picart's illustrations had originally been provided for that work. The ultimate sources for the information lay in Roman Catholic missionary accounts of religious beliefs encountered in Africa, the Americas and Asia. "Banier and Le Mascrier, while retaining much of this material, made considerable alterations to all sections of the work, particularly to those volumes dealing with Judaism and with the Catholic and Protestant churches. As well as correcting factual errors in Bernard’s account and adding much new material, they removed a number of passages which they regarded as satirical in their treatment of the Catholic Church. Instead they inserted a good deal of forthright proclamation of the primacy of Catholicism over all other doctrines."

== Legacy ==
Banier's Euhemerist and rational explication of myth in his Explication historique des fables satisfied Enlightenment expectations, before the beginnings of modern analysis of mythology. "Of the writers who interpreted myth as gilded history, the Abbé Antoine Banier was probably the best-known, the most widely cited, and the least controversial" assert Burton Feldman and Robert D. Richardson. The book was translated into English and German. Diderot and his collaborators employed the abbé Banier's interpretations in the Encyclopédie, as intellectual common property of the Enlightenment.

Étienne de Jouy (born in 1764) recalled in 1815

I remember that, in my earliest youth, the book I loved the most, after Robinson Crusoe, was that of the abbé Banier, where he displays, where he explains these ingenious emblems by means of which the Ancients gave, so to speak, a soul to all beings, a body to all thoughts.

In 1820 his work (as abridged by Abbe Tressan) was translated into English by Frances Arabella Rowden, an educator who, according to Mary Russell Mitford, was not only a poet, but "had a knack of making poetesses of her pupils".

By 1887 John Fiske could write, in Myths and Myth-Makers: Old Tales and Superstitions Interpreted by Comparative Mythology

What, then, is a myth? The theory of Euhemeros, which was so fashionable a century ago, in the days of the Abbe Banier, has long since been so utterly abandoned that to refute it now is but to slay the slain. The peculiarity of this theory was that it cut away all the extraordinary features of a given myth, wherein dwelt its inmost significance, and to the dull and useless residuum accorded the dignity of primeval history.

== Selected publications ==
- Explication historique des fables, où l'on découvre leur origine et leur conformité avec l'histoire ancienne (2 volumes, 1711)
- Troisième Voyage du sieur Paul Lucas, fait en 1714, par ordre de Louis XIV dans la Turquie, l'Asie, la Sourie, la Palestine, la Haute et la Basse-Égypte (3 volumes, 1719)
- Supplément à l'Homère de Madame Dacier, contenant la vie d'Homère, par Madame Dacier, avec une dissertation sur la durée du siège de Troie par M. l'abbé Banier (1731)
- Ovide : Les Métamorphoses (2 volumes, 1732)
- La Mythologie et les fables expliquées par l'histoire (3 volumes, 1738–1740)
- Histoire générale des cérémonies religieuses de tous les peuples du monde, représentées en 243 figures dessinées de la main de Bernard Picard; avec des explications historiques et curieuses par M. l'abbé Banier et par M. l'abbé Le Mascrier (1741)
