= Hierophant =

Religious function

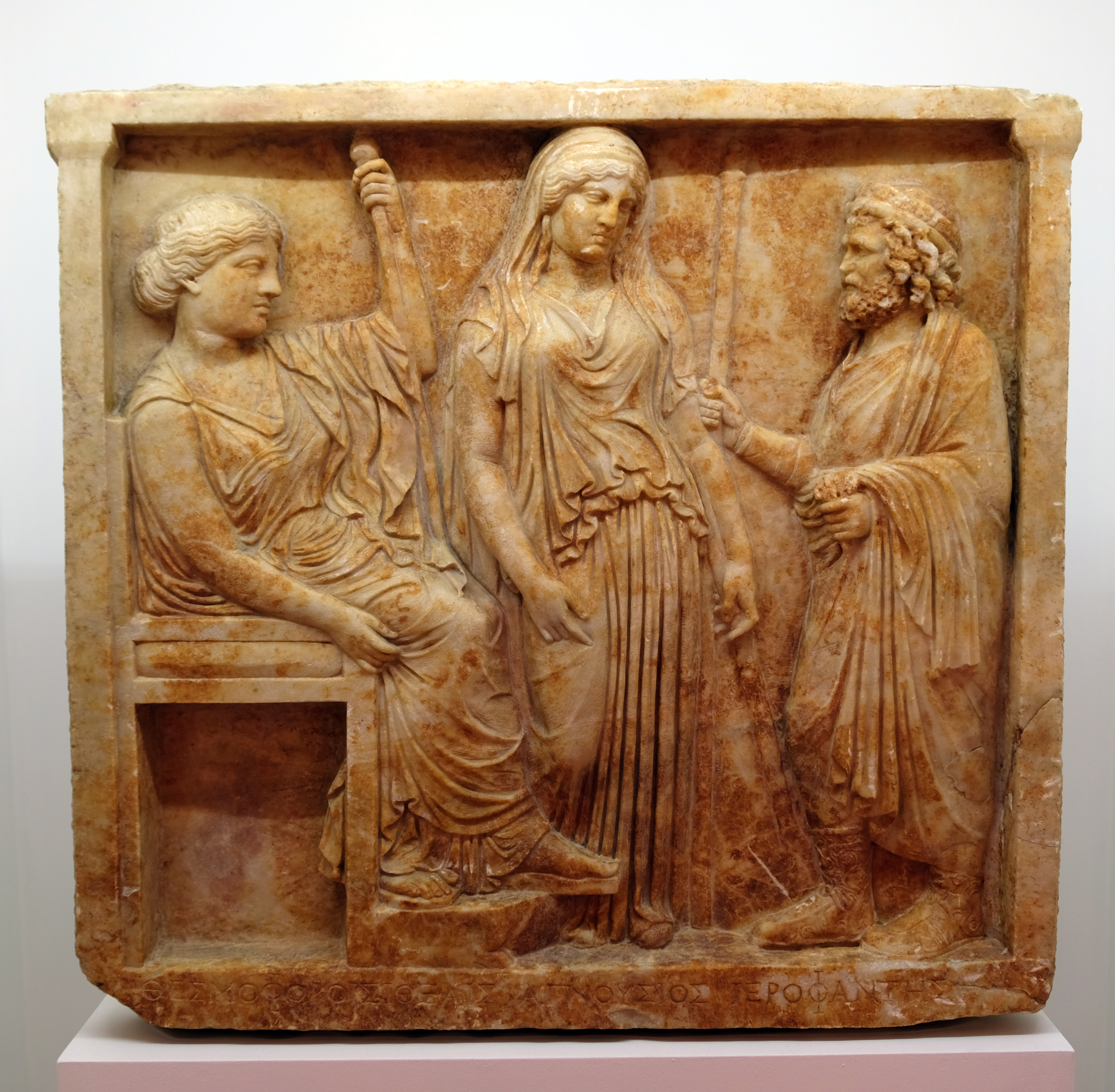
Votive relief depicting the hierophant of the Eleusinian Mysteries addressing Demeter and Persephone, 2nd century AD, Ancient Agora of Athens Museum Greece.

A hierophant (Ancient Greek: ἱεροφάντης, romanized: hierophántēs) is a person who brings religious congregants into the presence of that which is deemed holy. As such, a hierophant is an interpreter of sacred mysteries and arcane principles.

The word comes from ancient Greece, where it was constructed from the combination of τὰ ἱερά (ta hiera, 'the holy') and φαίνω (phainō, 'to reveal').

== Greek priesthood ==
Hierophant was the title of the chief priest at the Eleusinian Mysteries in ancient Attica. It was an office inherited within the genos of the Eumolpidae, one of the two main clans which managed the Eleusinian cult—the other being the Cerycids. Occasionally from the late fourth century BC and consistently from the first century BC, hierophants practised "hieronymy", which means that they were referred to during their lifetime as "hierophant" instead of their personal name.

The known hierophants at Eleusis are:

- Zacorus, early 5th century BC
- Theodorus, before 415 – after 408 BC
- Archias, c. 379 BC
- Lacrateides, before 353 – 350/49 BC or later
- -ottus, c. 333 BC
- Eurymedon, c. 323 BC
- Eurycleides, c. 317–307 BC
- "Hierophant" (Mnesiarchus?) son of Nouphrades of Perithoedae, late 4th century BC
- Chaeretius son of Prophetes of Eleusis, c. 248 BC
- Aristocles of Perithoedae, 183/2–148 BC or later
- Amynomachus adopted son of Eucles of Halae, after 148 BC (natural brother of Aristocles)
- Menecleides son of Theophemus of Kydathenaeum, last quarter of the 2nd century BC
- "Hierophant" son of Eustrophus of Piraeus, last quarter of the 2nd century BC
- Theophemus son of Menecleides of Kydathenaeum, end of the 2nd century BC
- "Hierophant", c. 86/5 BC, when he served as eponymous archon
- "Hierophant", mid-first century AD
- Tiberius Claudius Oenophilus son of Callicratides of Tricorynthus, end of the 1st century AD
- Julius "Hierophant", end of the 1st century AD
- Titus Flavius Straton, c. 125 AD
- Firmus "Hierophant" of Gargettus, mid-2nd century AD
- Decimus Ju- of Piraeus, mid-2nd century AD
- "Hierophant" of Hagnous, c. 138–150 AD
- Julius "Hierophant", 168–191 or 192 AD
- Tiberius Claudius Apollinarius son of Tiberius Claudius Apollodorus of Acharnae, 191 or 192 – 193/4 AD
- Nummius "Hierophant" of Phaleron, 194 – before 209 AD
- Claudius "Hierophant" of Marathon, c. 209/10 AD
- Apollonius son of Apollonius, c. 215 AD
- Heracleides, c. 220–230 AD
- Logimus, c. 220–230 AD
- Titus Flavius Glaucus son of Titus Flavius Glaucus of Marathon, c. 225–235 AD
- "Hierophant", before or after Glaucus
- Erotius, after 235 AD
- "Hierophant" son of Xenagoras, first half of the 4th century AD.
- Nestorius, before 355 – not long before 392 AD, an associate of Julian the Apostate, and initiator of Eunapius

Eunapius and Vettius Agorius Praetextatus are notable examples.

== In modern culture ==
=== Rider Waite tarot ===
In the Rider–Waite tarot deck and similar decks, The Hierophant (known in the Tarot de Marseille as The Pope) is one of the twenty-two trump cards comprising the Major Arcana, and represents conformity to social standards, or a deference to the established social moral order. As the guide towards knowledge, insight, and wisdom, in a Tarot reading it might, for example, represent a priest, scholar, therapist, or teacher, possibly similar to the Hermit or the King of Cups cards.

A. E. Waite wrote that the Hierophant:

...symbolizes also all things that are righteous and sacred on the manifest side. As such, he is the channel of grace belonging to the world of institution as distinct from that of Nature, and he is the leader of salvation for the human race at large. He is the order and the head of the recognized hierarchy, which is the reflection of another and greater hierarchic order; but it may so happen that the pontiff forgets the significance of his symbolic state and acts as if he contained within his proper measures all that his sign signifies or his symbol seeks to shew [sp] forth. He is not, as it has been thought, philosophy—except on the theological side; he is not inspiration; and his is not religion, although he is a mode of its expression.

== See also ==
- Daduchos
- Hierophany
- Hierophylakes
- Mystagogue
- Patriarchate
- Pontifex, "bridge-builder" between Heaven and Earth or between the spiritual world and the temporal one
- Sacred mysteries
