= Eumolpidae =

Family of priests who maintained the Eleusinian Mysteries

The Eumolpidae /ˌjuːˈmɒlpɪdiː/ (Ancient Greek: Εὐμολπίδαι, Eumolpidai) were a family of priests at Eleusis who maintained the Eleusinian Mysteries during the Hellenic era. As hierophants, they popularized the cult and allowed many more to be initiated into the secrets of Demeter and Persephone.

The legendary genealogy of the Eumolpidae cast them as descendants of Eumolpus, one of the first priests of Demeter at Eleusis, through his second son, Herald-Keryx. Eumolpus, "untainted by blame" is named among the archaic leaders of Eleusis in the Homeric Hymn to Demeter 149–156. Through Eumolpus, they were supposedly related to either Poseidon or Hermes. The last legitimate hierophant at Eleusis, just before the extinguishing of the mysteries at the time of Alaric's invasion in 396 CE, traced his descent from Eumolpos. The other family with a hereditary Eleusinian priesthood were the Kerykes.

== See also ==
- List of Greek deities
