= Rajab Bursi =

Iraqi Shia theologian (d.1411)

Rajab al-Borsi
- Title: al-Hafiz

Personal life
- Born: 1333 Bors, Iraq.
- Died: 1411 (aged 77–78) Mashhad, Iran.
- Cause of death: Unknown.
- Notable idea(s): Neoplatonism, Hermeticism, Hurufism, High Imamology
- Notable work(s): Mashariq Anwar al-Yaqin, Mashariq al-Amaan, al-Durr al-Thameen, al-Alfayn fi Saadatul Kawnayn

Religious life
- Religion: Islam
- Sect: Shia Islam
- Creed: Twelver
- Movement: Hurufism

al-Hafiż Raḍī al-Dīn Rajab b. Muḥammad b. Rajab al-Ḥillī al-Borsi (Arabic:الحافظ رضي الدين رجب بن محمد بن رجب البرسي الحلي; c. 1333-1411) was an 'Iraqi Shia theologian, mystic, hadith narrator, writer, and poet. Bursi was born in contemporary Iraq, near Hilla, in the village of Bors, and moved to the Iranian province of Khurasan, to escape accusations of heresy, later in life. Some sources indicate that he might have been murdered by the Timurids during the Shia persecutions.

== Early life ==
Rajab al-Bursi was born in 1333, in the small village of Borsippa, which also contains a large Ziggurat, identified as the Tower of Babel. Not much is known of his early life, save that he may have been of Iranian descent. Writing on his origins, Bursi states:

عُمانيًّا مُراديًّا مَجوسيًّا يَهوديًّا لِهذا قَد غَدا يُبغِضُ

Omani, Moradi, Magian, Jew. For this, hatred may soon arise

لِهذا قَد غَدا يُبغِضُ زَكيَّ الطِّينِ كوفيًّا، وفي المَولِدِ والمَحتِدِ بَرسِيًّا

For this (reason), tomorrow he may hate the pure clay of Kufa, and in both birth and lineage, of Bors and of Hillah.

== Education and Later Life ==
Bursi received a traditional juristic education in the town of Hillah, being accomplices with Fakhr al-Muhaqqiqin, al-Shahid al-Awwal, and al-Karaki, however he is never mentioned in any hagiographical works until the 17th century "Wasail al-Shia" by Hurr al-Amili.

Bursi was also a Mujtahid, and allegedly wrote a full treatise on Fiqh, making him an Ayatollah by modern standards.

Later on, he came in contact with various Hermetic doctrines propagated by the Hurufi movement of Fazlallah Astarabadi, such as Correspondence, the Microcosm–macrocosm analogy and Transcendentalism. This eventually forced him out of Hillah by a "group of envious monkeys," most likely a group of heavily orthodox jurists, and he eventually migrated to Sabziwar in Khorasan, then to Mashhad, which at the time was under the Sarbedars following the Ilkhanate collapse. There is a story pertaining to Bursi: that as he was being oppressed in Hillah, he received a vision of a "large light" coming from the East (Khorasan), which prompted him to travel. Bursi wrote most of, if not all of his works in Mashhad, as all manuscripts have been traced or found in Mashhad.

After the Sarbedars collapsed, Bursi once again fled, from Mashhad all the way to Ardestan, to a small village, known as Beheshtabad, where he died, and is currently buried. He is known by the people of the village as "Shaykh-e-Biyabani". His tomb is in poor condition but receives thousands of pilgrims yearly.

== Theology ==
Rajab al-Bursi evidently had access to many archaic Twelver works, such as the source material of the famous Kitab al-Wahida by Ibn Jumhuur. The source of most controversy upon him, however, has been the many sermons in his magnum opus (Mashariq Anwar al-Yaqin), where Ali purportedly makes various gnostic declarations, such as the self-declaration of "I am the First, I am the Last". However, these sermons are fairly tame among the "high maarifah" strain of Twelver Imamism, and have had a fair share of theologically conform interpretations. The Shaykhi Hierophant Kazim al-Rashti, wrote a multi-voluminous commentary on one of these sermons.

Bursi believes that God, ineffable and transcendent, beyond all form and likeness, in a neoplatonic sense where the One is the Monad, created the "Word", which is the Kalimah, Qalam, and Light of Muhammad identified across Islamic literature, and that Word was used to create creation. It is through this belief that he receives the most criticism, along with his alleged Sufi-tendencies due to him quoting a hadith of Junayd al-Baghdadi in his work Mashariq al-Amaan.

These sermons are: Khutbatul Tutanjiyyah (the Sermon of the Two Gulfs), Khutbatul Iftikhariya (the Sermon of Pride) and Hadith al-Nawraniyya (the Tradition of Luminous light).

== Works ==
1. Arcana of the Imams (Asrār al-Aʾimmah - أسرار الأئمة)
2. Arcana of Letters (Asrār al-Ḥurūf - أسرار الحروف)
3. The Sixteen Doors on Hadith (Al-Abwāb al-Sittata ʿAshar fī al-Ḥadīth - الأبواب الستة عشر في الحديث)
4. The Two Thousand (Al-Alfayn fī Waṣf Sādāt al-Kawnayn - الألفين في وصف سادة الكونين)
5. The Establishment of Tawḥīd and the Blessings upon the Prophet and His Guiding Imams (Peace Be Upon Them) (Inshāʾ al-Tawḥīd wa al-Ṣalawāt ʿalā al-Nabī wa Ālihi al-Aʾimmah al-Hudāt ʿalayhim al-salām - إنشاء التوحيد والصلوات على النبي وآله الأئمة الهداة عليهم السلام)
6. Exegesis of Sūrat al-Ikhlāṣ (Tafsīr Sūrat al-Ikhlāṣ - تفسير سورة الإخلاص)
7. The Special Virtues of Allah’s Beautiful Names (Khawāṣ Aṣmāʾ Allāh al-Ḥusnā - خواص أسماء الله الحسنى)
8. The Precious Pearl: Five Hundred Verses Revealed from the Lord of the Worlds on the Virtues of Our Master, the Commander of the Faithful, According to Most Interpreters of Religion (Al-Durr al-Thamīn fī Khams Miʾah Āyah Nazalat min Kalām Rabb al-ʿĀlamīn fī Faḍāʾil Mawlānā Amīr al-Muʾminīn bi-Ittifāq Akthar al-Mufassirīn min Ahl al-Dīn - الدر الثمين في خمسمائة آية نزلت من كلام رب العالمين في فضائل مولانا أمير المؤمنين باتفاق أكثر المفسرين من أهل الدين) (Of which the attribution to him is very criticised, with many saying it is a work by a later Safavid scholar summarising Bursis tafsir across Mashariq)
9. The Oriental Lights of Certainty in the Realities of the Arcana of the Commander of the Faithful – His Most Famous Work (Mashāriq Anwār al-Yaqīn fī Ḥaqāʾiq Asrār Amīr al-Muʾminīn - مشارق أنوار اليقين في حقائق أسرار أمير المؤمنين)
10. The Illuminating Glimpse of the Revealer in the Secrets of Names, Attributes, Letters, and Verses, and What Corresponds to Them in Supplications and Words (Lamaʿat al-Kāshif fī Asrār al-Asmāʾ wa al-Ṣifāt wa al-Ḥurūf wa al-Āyāt wa Mā Yunāsibuhā min al-Daʿawāt wa Yuqāribuhā min al-Kalimāt - لمعة الكاشف في أسرار الأسماء والصفات والحروف والآيات وما يناسبها من الدعوات ويقاربها من الكلمات)
11. The Glowing Lights of Glorification and Its Comprehensive Secrets in Tawḥīd In Speculative Theology and Tenents of Faith (Lawāmiʿ Anwār al-Tamjīd wa Jawāmiʿ Asrārihi fī al-Tawḥīd fī ʿIlm al-Kalām wa al-ʿAqāʾid - لوامع أنوار التمجيد وجوامع أسراره في التوحيد. في علم الكلام والعقائد)
12. The Rising Lights of Security and the Essence of the Realities of Faith (Mashāriq al-Amān wa Lubāb Ḥaqāʾiq al-Īmān - مشارق الأمان ولباب حقائق الإيمان)
13. The Births of the Imams and Their Virtues (Mawālīd al-Aʾimmah wa Faḍāʾiluhum - مواليد الأئمة وفضائلهم)
14. The Mahdī’s Lamentation and the Imāmī Condolence (Al-Nudbah al-Mahdiyyah wa al-Taʿziyyah al-Imāmiyyah - الندبة المهدية والتعزية الإمامية)
15. The Unity of Existence – A Book on Philosophy (Waḥdat al-Wujūd, Kitāb fī al-Falsafah - وحدة الوجود، كتاب في الفلسفة)
16. A Treatise on Sending Blessings upon the Prophet and the Imams (Risālah fī al-Ṣalawāt ʿalā al-Rasūl wa al-Aʾimmah - رسالة في الصلوات على الرسول والأئمة)
17. A Treatise on the Visitation of the Commander of the Faithful (Peace Be Upon Him) (Risālah fī Ziyārat Amīr al-Muʾminīn (ʿalayhi al-salām) - رسالة في زيارة أمير المؤمنين (عليه السلام))

== Sources ==
B. T Lawson "The Light of Certainty in Heritage of Sufism", Oxford, 1999 pp 225–244
