= Baraghani =

Baraghani (Persian: برغانی, Arabic: البرغاني meaning from the village of Baraghan or related to it) is an Iranian surname. Notable people with the surname include:

- Mohammad Taqi Baraghani.
- Muhammad Salih Baraghani.
- Fatima Baraghani, better known as Táhirih and Qurratu l-`Ayn, an influential poet and theologian of the Bábí Faith in Iran.
