= Precursor (religion) =

Holy person who announced the approaching appearance of a prophet

In religion, a precursor, also known as forerunner, predecessor, harbinger or herald, is a holy person who announced the approaching appearance of a central figure of the religion or who identified a central figure of the religion during the latter's childhood.

== List of precursors ==
- Asita in Buddhism
- John the Baptist in Christianity
- Bahira or Sergius in Islam
- Shaykh Ahmad, forerunner of Bábism (in the Bábí-Bahá'í view)
- Sayyid Kazim Rashti, forerunner of Bábism (in the Bábí-Bahá'í view)
- Báb, forerunner and herald of the Bahá'í Faith (in the Bahá'í view)

== See also ==
- List of founders of religious traditions
