= Táhirih =

Influential poet and theologian of the Bábí faith in Iran

Táhirih Qurrat al-'Ayn
- Born: Fatemeh Baraghani; 1814 or 1817; Qazvin, Qajar Iran
- Died: 16–27 August 1852 (aged 35); Ilkhani Garden, Tehran, Iran
- Occupations: Poet theologist and women's rights activist
- Spouse: Mohammad Baraghani (divorced)
- Children: 3
- Parents: Mohammad Saleh Baraghani (father); Ameneh Khanom Qazvin (mother)

Táhirih (Ṭāhira) (Persian: طاهره, lit. 'The Pure One') also called Qurrat al-ʿAyn (Arabic: قرة العين, lit. 'Solace/Consolation of the Eyes') are both titles of Fatimah Baraghani/Umm-i Salmih (1814 or 1817 – 16–27 August 1852), an influential poet, women's rights activist and theologian of the Bábí faith in Iran. She was one of the Letters of the Living, the first group of followers of the Báb. Her life, influence and execution made her a key figure of the religion. The daughter of Mohammad Saleh Baraghani, she was born into one of the most prominent families of her time. Táhirih led a radical interpretation that, though it split the Babi community, wedded messianism with Bábism.

As a young girl she was educated privately by her father and showed herself a talented writer. Whilst in her teens she married the son of her uncle, with whom she had a difficult marriage. In the early 1840s she became a follower of Shaykh Ahmad and began a secret correspondence with his successor Kazim Rashti. Táhirih travelled to the Shiʻi holy city of Karbala to meet Kazim Rashti, but he died a number of days before her arrival. In 1844 aged about 27, in search of the Qa'im through the Islamic teachings she figured his whereabouts. Independent to any individual she became acquainted with the teachings of the Báb and accepted his religious claims as Qa'im. She soon won renown and infamy for her zealous teachings of his faith and "fearless devotion". Subsequently, exiled back to Iran, Táhirih taught her faith at almost every opportunity. The Persian clergy grew resentful of her and she was detained several times. Throughout her life she battled with her family, who wanted her to return to their traditional beliefs.

Táhirih was probably best remembered for unveiling herself in an assemblage of men during the Conference of Badasht. The unveiling caused much controversy, but Baháʼu'lláh named her Tahirih "the Pure One" at that same Conference. After the historic Conference of Badasht, a number of those who attended were so amazed at the fearlessness and outspoken language of that heroine, that they felt it their duty to acquaint the Báb with the character of her startling and unprecedented behaviour. They strove to tarnish the purity of her name. To their accusations the Bab replied: "What am I to say regarding her whom the Tongue of Power and Glory has named Tahirih [the Pure One]?" These words proved sufficient to silence those who had endeavoured to undermine her position. From that time onwards she was designated by the believers as Tahirih. The Báb continued to highly praise Táhirih and in one of his later writings equates Táhirih's station as equal to that of the seventeen other male 'Letters of the Living' combined. She was soon arrested and placed under house arrest in Tehran. In mid-1852 she was executed in secret on account of her Bábí faith and her unveiling. Before her death she declared: "You can kill me as soon as you like, but you cannot stop the emancipation of women." Since her death, Bábí and Baháʼí literature venerated her to the level of martyr, being described as "the first woman suffrage martyr". As a prominent Bábí (she was the seventeenth disciple or "Letter of the Living" of the Báb) she is highly regarded by followers of the Baháʼí Faith and Azalis and often mentioned in Baháʼí literature as an example of courage in the struggle for women's rights. Her date of birth is uncertain as birth records were destroyed at her execution.

== Early life (birth–1844) ==
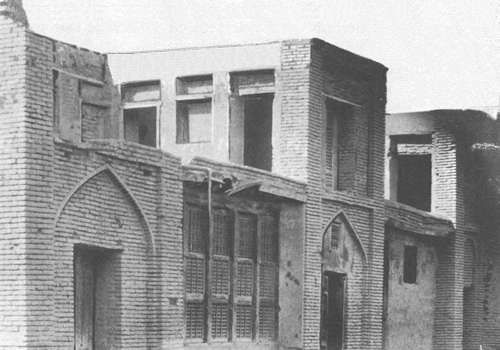
The home of Táhirih in Qazvin.

Táhirih was born Fātemeh Baraghāni in Qazvin, Iran (near Tehran), the oldest of four daughters of Mohammad Saleh Baraghani, an Usuli mujtahid who was remembered for his interpretations of the Quran, his eulogies of the tragedies of Karbala, his zeal for the execution of punishments, and his active opposition to the consumption of wine. Her mother was from a Persian noble family, whose brother was the imam of the Shah Mosque of Qazvin. Her mother as well as Táhirih and all her sisters all studied in the Salehiyya, the Salehi madrasa her father had established in 1817, which included a women's section. Táhirih's uncle, Mohammad Taqi Baraghani, was also a mujtahid whose power and influence dominated the court of Fath-Ali Shah Qajar. The lack of contemporary evidence makes it impossible to determine her exact date of birth. Historian and contemporary Nabíl-i-Aʻzam cites that it was in 1817, whilst others claim an earlier date of 1814. Her grandson suggests a much later date of 1819, whilst some modern historians claim she was born about 1815. Shoghi Effendi and William Sears suggest the date of 1817, and other writers agree. This is supported by claims by a chronicler from the 19th century, who wrote that Táhirih was "thirty-six years of age" when she was killed, in accordance to the lunar calendar. After interviewing Táhirih's family and the families of contemporaries as well as reading documents about her life Martha Root believed that the most accurate date of birth was between 1817 and 1819. These findings are contested in several books and articles, but the evidence does not conclusively support either date.

The Baraghani brothers had migrated from an obscure village near Qazvin to the city where they made their fortunes in ecclesiastical schools. They soon rose to the ranks of high-ranking clerics in the court of the Shah of Persia and even running religious sections of Qazvin. The brothers also involved themselves in the mercantile business accumulating great wealth and royal favour. Her father was himself a noted and respected cleric, as was her older uncle who married a daughter of the monarch. Táhirih's two younger uncles were not as elevated as the older ones but still had reasonable power in the court. Her aunt was a renowned poet and calligrapher in royal circles and wrote government decrees in her "beautiful hand". At the time of her birth, the Baraghani's were one of the most respected and powerful families in Persia.

=== Education ===
Táhirih was educated particularly well for a girl of her era. A literate woman was itself a rare phenomenon and surprisingly her father decided to break from protocol and personally tutor his daughter. Though still living in a strict religious home, Táhirih was educated in theology, jurisprudence, Persian literature, and poetry. She was allowed to undertake Islamic studies, and was known for her ability to memorize the Qurʼan as well as being able to grasp hard to understand points of religious law. Her father was reported to have lamented at the fact that she was not a son. Táhirih was said to have surpassed her father's male students which further convinced him of her literary talents. Her father even allowed her to listen to his lessons which he gave male pupils, on the condition that she hide behind a curtain and not let anybody know her presence. Her father affectionately knew her as "Zarrín Táj" ("Crown of Gold").

Under the education of her father and uncle, the young Táhirih was able to grasp a better understanding of theological and educational matters compared to her contemporaries. Girls were expected to remain docile and reticent and many were reluctant to allow their daughters to pursue an education of some sort. Her father Mohammad-Saleh Baraghani was a writer in his own right and his writings laud the martyrdom of the Muhammad's grandson and third Imam Husayn ibn Ali and discuss Persian literature. He was reported to devote much of his time to scholarship rather than involving himself in the court, unlike his elder brother. Amanat cites that Táhirih was also known for her esoteric interpretation of Quranic verses. Táhirih's education in Qazvin proved itself in later years, inspiring many new trends among women in her social-circle and may have been instrumental in pressing Táhirih towards the more radical Shaykhi and Bábí teachings. Author Christopher De Bellaigue describes her as 'Simone de Beauvoir meets Joan of Arc' for being both a feminist and a saint.

Táhrih exerted a powerful charm and charisma on those who met her, and she was generally praised for her beauty. Contemporaries and modern historians comment on Táhirih's rare physical beauty. A courtier described her as "moonfaced", "with hair like musk" whilst one of her fathers pupils wondered how a woman of her beauty could be so intelligent. Historian Nabíl-i-Aʻzam reports the "highest terms of [her] beauty", George Curzon, 1st Marquess Curzon of Kedleston, wrote, "beauty and the female sex also lent their consecration to the new creed and the heroism… the lovely but ill-fated poetess of Qazvín". British Professor Edward Granville Browne who spoke to a great number of her contemporaries, wrote that she was renowned for her "marvellous beauty". The Shah's Austrian physician, Jakob Eduard Polak, also cited her beauty. ʻAbdu'l-Bahá and Bahíyyih Khánum noted her beauty in several talks and writings. Táhirih's education with her father lead her to become a devoutly religious and she upheld these beliefs for the rest of her life. It also made her hungry for knowledge and she busied herself with reading and writing religious and other forms of literature. Her formal education ended when she was about thirteen or fourteen, when she was summoned by her father to consent to a betrothal arranged by her uncle and father.

=== Marriage and developments ===
Though showing herself a capable writer and poet, Táhirih was forced to comply with family pressure and at the age of fourteen she was married to her cousin Muhammad Baraghani the son of her uncle. The marriage resulted in three children, two sons: Ibrahim and Ismaʻil and one daughter. The marriage however, was an unhappy one from the start and Muhammad Baraghani seemed to have been reluctant to allow his wife to further her literary pursuits. In Qazvin Táhirih reportedly won renown for her beauty and respect for her knowledge, however the latter was a quality regarded as undesirable in a daughter and wife. Her husband eventually became the leader of the Friday prayers. Her two sons fled from their father after their mother's death to Najaf and Tehran whilst the daughter died shortly after her mother's death. It was in the home of her cousin that Táhirih first became acquainted with and started correspondence with leaders of the Shaykhi movement, including Kazim Rashti, which flourished in the Shiʻi shrine cities in Iraq.

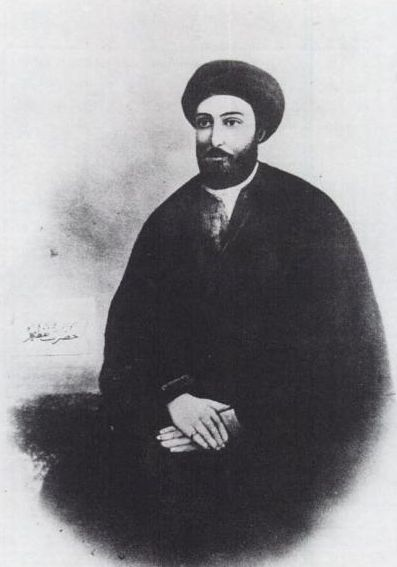
Kazim Rashti

Táhirih was introduced to the radical new Shaykhi teachings in the library of her cousin, Javad Valiyani. At first Valiyani was reluctant to allow his cousin to read the literature, citing the fact her father and uncle were great enemies of the movement. Táhirih however was greatly attracted to the teachings, and was in regular correspondence with Siyyid Kazim, whom she regularly wrote asking theological questions. Siyyid Kazim was gratified with her devotion and pleased that he had another supporter amongst the powerful Baraghani family. He wrote to her describing her as his "Solace of the Eyes"("Qurat-ul-Ayn") and "the soul of my heart". Initially Táhirih kept her new religious beliefs secret from her family. However, with her newfound faith Táhirih found it difficult to comply with her family's rigid religious doctrine and began openly battling with them. The religious tension resulted in Táhirih imploring her father, uncle and husband to allow her to make a pilgrimage to the holy shrines of Karbala. At the age of about 26 in 1843, Táhirih separated from her husband and accompanied by her sister made a sojourn to Karbala. Her real motive for the pilgrimage however was to meet her teacher, Kazim Rashti. To her dismay, by the time she had arrived, Kazim had died. With his widow's approval, she set up in Siyyid Kazim's house and continued teaching his followers from behind a curtain.

In Karbala, Táhirih was a now teaching the pupils of Kazim Rashti. His widow had allowed her to gain access to much of his unpublished works, and Táhirih made a bond with other women of his household. She was however forced to follow protocol and taught her pupils from behind a curtain, as it was regarded as unbecoming for a woman's face to be seen in public. It was equally considered unsuitable for a woman to be in the presence of men let alone teach, and it caused much controversy in Karbala. She did nevertheless gain a wide and popular following including many women such as Kurshid Bagum (the future wife of the Núrayn-i-Nayyirayn) and the sister of Mullá Husayn. Another notable follower was the mother of Kázim-i-Samandar. Her teaching was received negatively by the male clergy and other male Shaykhis forced her to retreat to Kadhimiya for a short period.

=== Conversion ===
In 1844, she, through correspondence, found and accepted ʻAli Muhammad of Shiraz (known as the Báb) as the Mahdi. She became the seventeenth disciple or "The Letter of the Living" of the Báb, and rapidly become known as one of his most renowned followers. Táhirih asked the husband of her sister to send the Báb a message saying: "The effulgence of Thy face flashed forth, and the rays of Thy visage arose on high. Then speak the word, "Am I not your Lord?" and 'Thou art, Thou art!' we will all reply." As the only woman in this initial group of disciples, she is often compared to Mary Magdalene who, in turn, is likewise often considered to be a Christian antecedent of Tahirih. Unlike the other Letters of the Living, Táhirih never met the Báb. Continuing to reside in Siyyid Kazim's home, she started to promulgate the new religion of the Báb, Bábism, and attracted many Shakhis to Karbala.

== As a Bábí (1844–1848) ==
While in Karbala in Iraq, Táhirih continued teaching her new faith. After some of the Shiʻa clergy complained, the government moved her to Baghdad, where she resided at the home of the mufti of Baghdad, Shaykh Mahmud Alusi, who was impressed by her devotion and intellect. Táhirih was stoned as she left for Baghdad. There she started giving public statements teaching the new faith, and challenging and debating issues with the Shiʻa clergy. Táhirih's behaviour was regarded as unbecoming of a woman especially because of her family background and she was received negatively by the clergy. Despite this, many women admired her lessons and she gained a great number of women followers. At some point the authorities in Baghdad argued with the governor that since Táhirih was Persian she should instead be arguing her case in Iran, and in 1847, on instructions from the Ottoman authorities she, along with a number other Bábís, was deported to the Persian border. A reason may have been her increasing note of innovation in religious matters – in his early teachings, the Báb stressed the necessity for his followers to observe the Islamic Sharia, even to perform acts of supererogatory piety.Táhirih seems to have made this link before the Bāb himself but she received letters supporting her approach soon.

American Martha Root writes about Táhirih: "Picture in your mind one of the most beautiful young women in Iran, a genius, a poet, the most learned scholar of the Quran and the traditions; think of her as the daughter of a jurist family of letters, daughter of the greatest high priest of her province and very rich, enjoying high rank, living in an artistic palace, and distinguished among her...friends for her boundless, immeasurable courage. Picture what it must mean for a young woman like this, still in her twenties, to arise as the first woman disciple of [the Báb]".

=== Poetry ===
After her conversion to the Bábí faith, the poems of Táhirih flourished. In most she talks about her longing to meet the Báb. Her poetry illustrates an impressive knowledge of Persian and Arabic literature which Táhirih possessed, seldom seen in a woman in mid-nineteenth century Iran. One of the most famous poems attributed to her is named Point by Point. Although it is widely considered her signature poem and a masterpiece, it has been claimed by Mohit Tabátabá'i to be older and by someone else – though in making this claim he offered no proof and any argument to the contrary is not possible in Iran. When Táhirih was killed, hostile family members suppressed or destroyed her remaining poems, whilst her others were spread across Iran. It has been suggested that Táhirih had little interest in putting her poems in print. ʻAbdu'l-Bahá recalls that when he was aged five Táhirih would chant her poetry to him in her beautiful voice. Edward Granville Browne procured her poems from Bábí, Baháʼí and Azali sources and published them in his book A Year Amongst the Persians.

After collecting, translating, and publishing a volume of those poems commonly considered as having been written by Táhirih,The Poetry of Táhirih (2002), scholars John S. Hatcher and Amrollah Hemmat received a photocopy of two handwritten manuscripts from Bíjan Beidáíe, son of renowned scholar Dhuká'í Beidáíe who had originally submitted this manuscript to the Baháʼí archives of Iran. The result of this propitious find of poems previously unpublished, untranslated, and largely unknown, was the publication of two volumes by Hatcher and Hemmat containing both translation of the poetry into English and copies of the original calligraphy. The first volume Adam's Wish (2008) includes a lengthy poem called Adam's Wish, about the desire of Adam and all other past prophets to witness humanity's coming of age. The second volume The Quickening was published in 2011 and also includes copies of the original calligraphy of the second manuscript. As Hatcher and Hemmat explain in the introductions to these two volumes, some scholars question whether or not all the poems in the manuscript are by Táhirih. Dhuká'í Beidáíe himself states in Persian on page 256 of Adam's Wish that some of the poems may be written by Bihjat (Karím Khan-i-Máftí), one of the Báb'ís of Qazvin who corresponded with Táhirih through exchanges of poems, possibly during the period when she was imprisoned the house of the governor of Tehran in the period prior to her execution. In 2020 Yet another manuscript of untranslated and unpublished poetry was discovered by Hatcher and Hemmat that had been moved from Iran to the Research Department of the Bahá'í World Center shortly before the 1979 Revolution. Using the same format as their previous translated works of Táhirih, Hatcher and Hemmat translated the seventy-five poems into English verse and included the original text together with a glossary and extensive notes. Published in 2024 by the Bahá'í Publishing Trust, this work is titled Sparks of Fire: Unknown Poetry of Táhirih.

=== Return to Iran ===
During her journey back to Qazvin, she openly taught the Bábí faith, including on stops in Kirand and Kermanshah, where she debated with the leading cleric of the town, Aqa ʻAbdu'llah-i-Bihbihani. Aqa ʻAbdu'llah-i-Bihbihani, at this point, wrote to Táhirih's father asking his relatives to remove her from Kermanshah. She then travelled to the small town of Sahneh and then to Hamadan, where she met her brothers who had been sent to ask for her return to Qazvin. She agreed to return with her brothers after making a public statement in Hamedan regarding the Báb. Her father and uncle were particularly distressed at Táhirih's behaviour regarding it as bringing the Baraghani family to disgrace. Upon returning to Qazvin in July 1847 she refused to live with her husband whom she considered an infidel, and instead stayed with her brother.

=== Arriving in Qazvin and escape to Tehran ===
After arriving at the family home, her uncle and father endeavoured to convert her away from the Bábí faith, but Táhirih argued and presented religious "proofs" for the validity of the Báb's claims. A few weeks later her husband quickly divorced her, and her uncle Muhammad Taqi Baraghani began publicly denouncing his niece. This was very controversial in Qazvin and further undermined the Baraghani family. Rumours circulated in the court of Táhirih's immorality, but these were most likely hearsay concocted to undermine her position and ruin her reputation. A Qajar chronicler wrote that he was stunned by her beauty describing her "body like a peacock of Paradise", and that she had nine husbands (later changed to ninety). He also wrote she engaged in deviant behaviour with "wandering Bábís".

Such rumours were damaging to the Baraghani families reputation and Táhirih wrote a letter to her father claiming they were merely lies. To her father she alludes to "slanderous defamation" and denies "worldly love". Her father was reportedly convinced about his daughter's chastity. He remained constantly devoted to the memory of her. After the slander and abuse from the clergy in Qazvin he retired to Karbala, where he died in 1866. Her father may have remained unconvinced about the rumours but her uncle Mulla Muhammad Taqi Baraghani was horrified and resentful to the Báb, whom he blamed for having brought his family to ill repute.

While she was in Qazvin, her uncle, Mulla Muhammad Taqi Baraghani, a prominent Mujtahid who was known for his anti-Shaykhi and anti-Bábi stance, was murdered by a young Shaykhi, and the blame for this placed on her by her husband, even though she denied any involvement. During Táhirih's stay in Qazvin, Baraghani had embarked on a series of sermons in which he attacked the Báb and his followers. There is no hard evidence as to the identity of the murderer, nor any proof as to Táhirih's involvement or lack of it. With her arrest Táhirih's powerful father convinced the authorities that rather than kill Táhirih, she would be imprisoned in her home. Táhirih's father kept her under house-arrest in his cellar, appointing her maids to act as spies. Though interpreted as a cruel act in Root's interviews with family members of Táhirih one claimed this was done out of genuine fear for her safety. Her father was convinced of his daughters' innocence, but her husband was violently against her. He argued that Táhirih be put on trial for the murder of her uncle. Her father positively refused citing Táhirih would never leave her home. Nevertheless, authorities forcefully arrested Táhirih and one of her maids in the hope that she would testify against her.

In her trial, Táhirih was questioned hour after hour about the murder of her uncle, in which she denied any involvement. To exert pressure on her, Táhirih was threatened to be branded as was her maid who was almost tortured to procure evidence from Táhirih. However, it fell through after the confession of the murderer himself. Táhirih returned to her father's home, still a prisoner, and was kept under close watch.

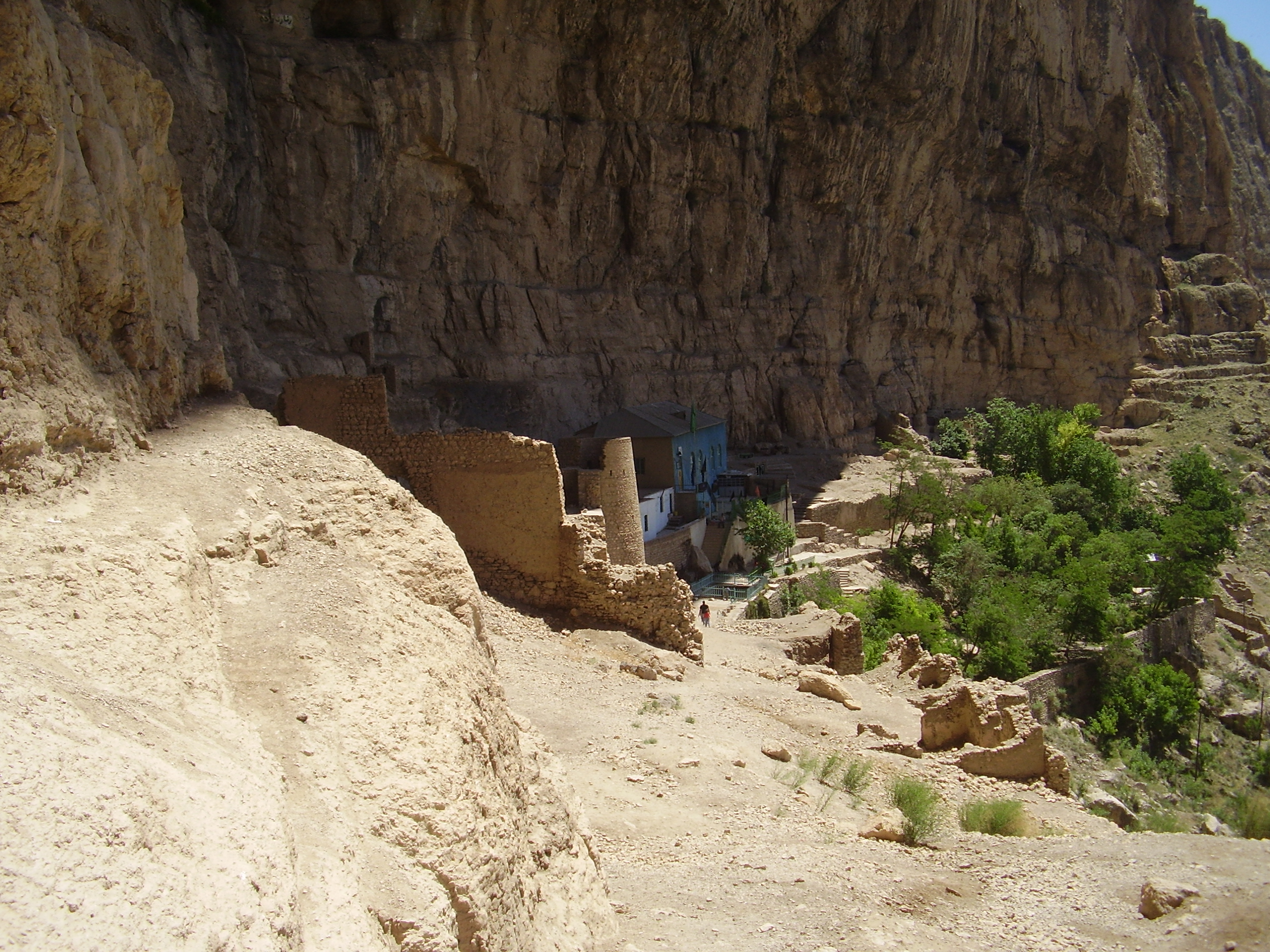
Fortress of Máh-Kú where the Báb was imprisoned.

This accusation led to her life being in danger, and through the help of Baháʼu'lláh, she escaped to Tehran. Táhirih stayed at the home of Baháʼu'lláh in the private parlour of his wife Ásíyih Khánum. Ásíyih personally looked after Táhirih whilst she was hiding in their house. It was there that she first met ʻAbdu'l-Bahá and grew very attached the boy of about three or four. Táhirih asked Baháʼu'lláh if she could go to Māku as a pilgrim to see the Báb, who was then still a prisoner, but Baháʼu'lláh explained the impossibility of the trek.

=== Conference of Badasht ===
In June–July 1848, a number of Bábí leaders met in the hamlet of Badasht at a conference, organized in part and financed by Baháʼu'lláh, that set in motion the public existence and promulgation of the Bábí movement.

In one account, the purpose of the conference was to initiate a complete break in the Babi community with the Islamic past. The same account notes that a secondary account was to find a way to free the Bab from the prison of Chiriq, and it was Tahirih who pushed the notion that there should be an armed rebellion to save the Bab and create the break. Another source states that there was no doubt that prominent Babi leaders wanted to plan an armed revolt. It seems that much of what Tahirih was pushing was beyond what most of the other Babis were about to accept.

Bábís were divided somewhat between those that viewed the movement as a break with Islam, centered around Táhirih, and those with a more cautious approach, centered around Quddus. As an act of symbolism, she took off her traditional veil in front of an assemblage of men on one occasion and brandished a sword on another. The unveiling caused shock and consternation amongst the men present. Prior to this, many had regarded Táhirih as the epitome of purity and the spiritual return of Fatimah, the daughter of Muhammad. Many screamed in horror at the sight, and one man was so horrified that he cut his own throat and, with blood pouring from his neck, fled the scene. Táhirih then arose and began a speech on the break from Islam. She quoted from the Quran, "verily, amid gardens and rivers shall the pious dwell in the seat of truth, in the presence of the potent King" as well as proclaiming herself the Word al-Qa'im would utter on the day of judgement. The unveiling caused great controversy that even led some of the Bábís to abandon their new faith.

The conference of Badasht is considered by Bábís and Baháʼís as a signal moment that demonstrated that the Sharia had been abrogated and superseded by Bábí law. The unveiling, however, led to accusations of immorality by Muslim clerics of the time, and later by a Christian missionary. The Báb responded to the accusations of immorality by supporting her position and endorsed the name Baháʼu'lláh gave her at the conference: the Pure (Táhirih). A jailer who had personal contact with her lauded her character and behavior and modern women scholars review this kind of accusation as part of a pattern faced by women leaders and writers then and since in a way that Azar Nafisi says, "the Islamic regime today… fears them and feels vulnerable in the face of a resistance that is not just political but existential."

== Imprisonment and death (1848–1852) ==
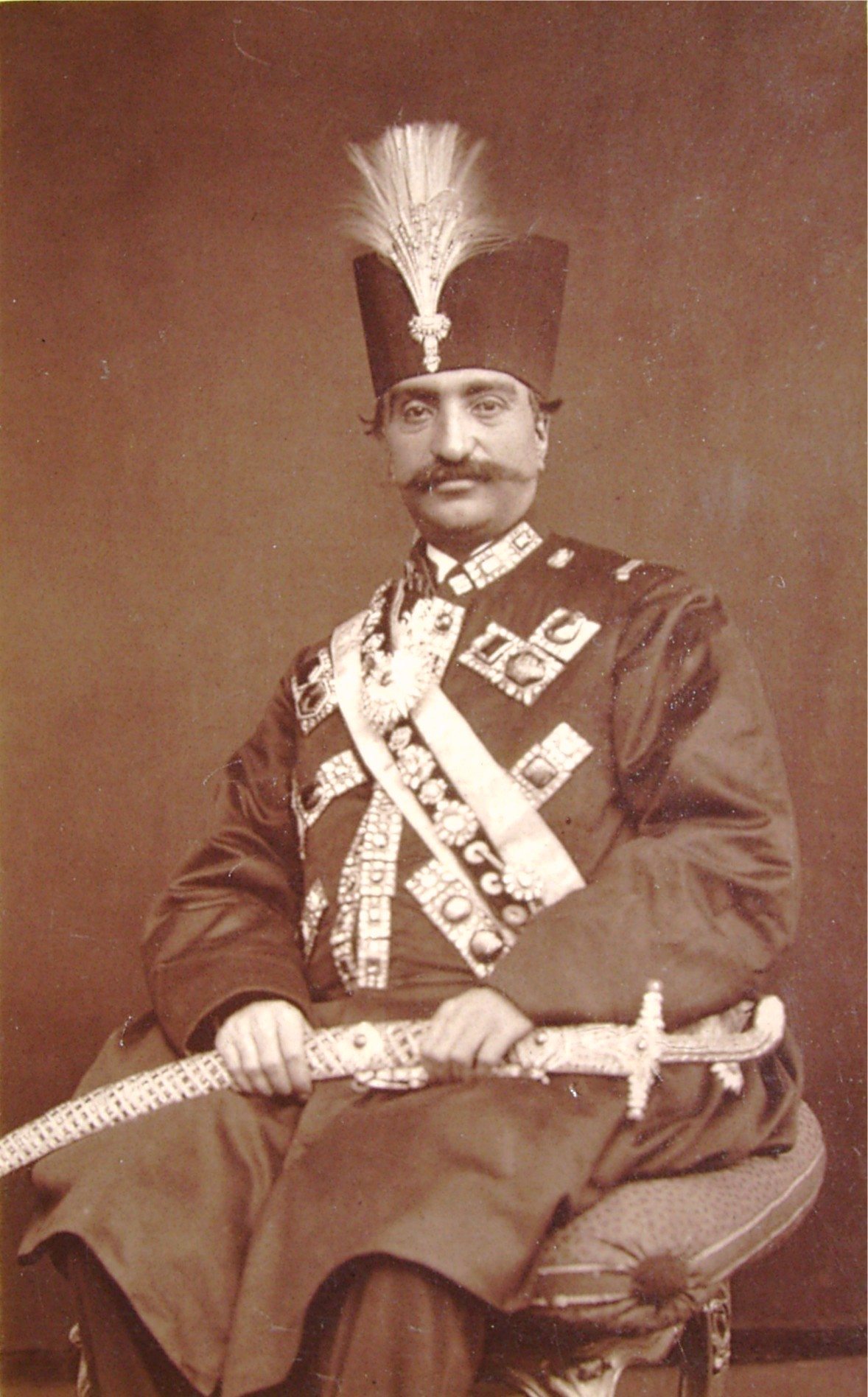
Naser al-Din Shah Qajar (r. 1848–1896)

After the conference at Badasht Táhirih and Quddus travelled to Mazandaran province together, where they then separated, very often facing harassment on their journey. There are conflicting reports as to the reason of this harassment. According to Lisan al-Mulk the harassment was due to their staying in the same inns, and using the same public bath. In a different account the Babis are harassed by anti-Babi inhabitants of villages that they pass through. Finally when they arrived in Barfurush, they were given some shelter among the Babis.

Nearby villagers attacked the Bábís and during that time Táhirih was captured, and put under house arrest in Tehran in the home of the Mahmud Khan. Whilst in the house of Mahmud Khan she earned respect from women around Tehran who flocked to see her and even the Mahmud Khan himself. Táhirih seemed to have gained the respect of Mahmud Khan and his family members. This is also her first visibility in western newspapers.

=== Presentation at Court ===
After her capture and arrest, Táhirih was escorted to Tehran. It was in Tehran that Táhirih was presented in the court to the young monarch Naser al-Din Shah Qajar. He was reported to have remarked "I like her looks, leave her, and let her be". She was then taken to the home of the chief Mahmud Khan. The Shah then wrote her a letter in which he explained that she should deny the teachings of the Báb, and that if she did so then she would be given an exalted position in his harem. Táhirih rejected his advances through a poem which she composed. The Shah was reportedly gratified by her intelligence. Despite the shah's request for her to be left alone, she was placed under house arrest. The day before her execution she was again presented to the shah, who questioned her again about her beliefs. It was for four years that Táhirih remained a prisoner.

=== Final sentence ===
Though a prisoner, Táhirih still had relative freedom in the sense that she still taught her religion to people in the mayor's house. She openly denounced polygamy, the veil and other restraints put upon women. Her words soon made her an influential character and women flocked to see Táhirih, including one princess of the Qajar family who converted. The clergy and members of the court, however, feared that she had grown too influential, and they organized seven conferences with Táhirih to convince her to recant her faith in the Báb. Instead, Táhirih presented religious "proofs" for the Báb's cause and—at the last of these conferences—exclaimed "when will you lift your eyes toward the Sun of Truth?". Her actions horrified the delegation and were regarded as unbecoming of a woman, no less one from her social background.

After the final conference, the delegation returned and began composing an edict denouncing Táhirih as a heretic, and implying that she should be sentenced to death. Táhirih was the first Iranian woman to be executed on grounds of "corruption on earth," a charge regularly invoked by the Islamic Republic today. Táhirih was then confined to one room in the home of the mayor. She spent her last days in prayer, mediation and fasting. "Weep not," she told the mayor's wife, "the hour when I shall be condemned to suffer martyrdom is fast approaching."

=== Execution ===
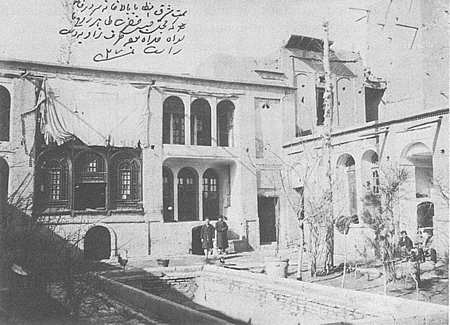
Prison of Táhirih in Tehran

Two years after the execution of the Báb, three Bábís, acting on their own initiative, attempted to assassinate Naser al-Din Shah Qajar as he was returning from the chase to his palace at Niyávarfin. The attempt failed, but was the cause of a fresh persecution of the Bábí. Táhirih was blamed due to her Bábí faith. When told shortly beforehand about her execution, Táhirih kissed the hands of the messenger, dressed herself in bridal attire, anointed herself in perfume, and said her prayers. To the wife of Mahmud Khan, she made one request: that she be left in peace to continue her prayers in peace. The young son of Mahmud Khan accompanied Táhirih to the garden. To him she gave a white, silk handkerchief with which she had chosen to be strangled.

In the dead of the night and in secret, Táhirih was taken to the nearby garden of Ilkhani in Tehran, and with her own veil was strangled to death. Her body was thrown into a shallow well and stones thrown upon it. A prominent Bábí, and subsequently Baháʼí, historian cites the wife of an officer who had the chance to know her that she was strangled by a drunken officer of the government with her own veil which she had chosen for her anticipated martyrdom. One of her most notable quotes is her last words: "You can kill me as soon as you like, but you cannot stop the emancipation of women." She was then aged about 35, and left behind three children. Dr Jakob Eduard Polak, the Shah's physician, was an eyewitness to the execution and described it as: "I was witness to the execution of Qurret el ayn, who was executed by the war minister and his adjutants; the beautiful woman endured her slow death with superhuman fortitude". ʻAbdu'l-Bahá eulogized Táhirih writing that she was a "woman chaste and holy, a sign and token of surpassing beauty, a burning brand of the love of God". The Times on 13 October 1852 reports the death of Táhirih, describing her as the "Fair Prophetess of Kazoeen", and the "Bab's Lieutenant".

== Legacy ==
Táhirih is considered one of the foremost women of the Bábí religion and an important figure in its development. As a charismatic individual, she was able to transcend the restrictions normally placed on women in traditional society where she lived, and thus attracted attention to the Cause. She wrote copiously on Bábí matters, and of that volume about a dozen significant works and a dozen personal letters have survived. They are outlined (including the contents of some further treatises that have been lost) by Denis MacEoin in 'The Sources for Early Babi Doctrines and History' 107–116. Around 50 poems are attributed to her, and are regarded highly in Persian culture.

In addition to being well known among Baháʼís, who consider her one of the leading women figures of their religion, Táhirih's influence has extended beyond the Baháʼí community as her life has come to inspire later generations of feminists. Azar Nafisi, a notable Iranian academic and author, has referred to her influence, saying that "the first woman to unveil and to question both political and religious orthodoxy was a woman named Táhirih who lived in [the] early 1800s... And we carry this tradition." Shahrnush Parsipur mentions her in a kind of genealogy of women writers she is inspired by. Azer Jafarov, professor at Baku State University, Azerbaijan, stated that "she influenced modern literature, raised the call for the emancipation of women, and had a deep impact on public consciousness.

A very early western account of Táhirih would have been on 2 January 1913 when ʻAbdu'l-Bahá, then head of the Baháʼí Faith, spoke on women's suffrage to the Women's Freedom League – part of his address and print coverage of his talk noted mentions of Táhirih to the organization.

Tahirih’s life has inspired many throughout the world. In 1997, the Tahirih Justice Center was founded by Layli Miller-Muro, as a non-profit organization dedicated to providing legal and social services to immigrant survivors of gender-based violence. Tahirih Justice Center is a secular organization founded on the principles of the Baha’i faith and works to create a world in which all people share equal rights and live in safety and with dignity. They have offices in Washington DC, Baltimore, Houston, Atlanta, and San Francisco.

== In art ==
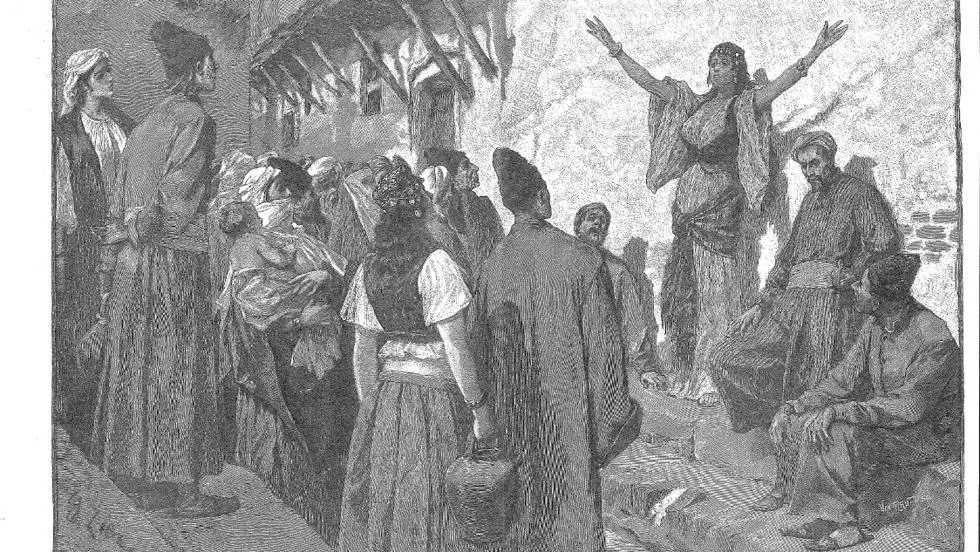
Drawing by Edouard Zier, who imagines Tahirih in public without a veil (Journal des Voyages, 5 June 1892).

Táhirh has been a focus of some writers of the Baháʼí Faith in fiction. Polish/Russian playwright Isabella Grinevskaya wrote the play Báb based on the life and events of the founder of the Bábí religion with a focus on Táhirih. which was performed in St. Petersburg in 1904 and again in 1916/7, and lauded by Leo Tolstoy and other reviewers at the time. In Velimir Khlebnikov's writings and poems she is mentioned frequently (as Russian: Гурриэт эль-Айн); a number of Khlebnikov's poems describes her execution (sometimes mistakenly as a burning on a stake).

About 1908 Constance Faunt Le Roy Runcie attempted to publish a novel about the Bab and "Persia's celebrated poetess Zerryn Taj" (another of Tahirih's names.)

Bahiyyih Nakhjavani published her La femme qui lisait trop (The Woman Who Reads Too Much) in 2007, the English edition was published in 2015. It tells the story of Táhirih. The writer adopts the revolving points of view of mother, sister, daughter, and wife respectively, to trace the impact of this woman's actions on her contemporaries and read her prophetic insights.

Nazanin Afshin-Jam is set to play a role as Tahirih in a film by Jack Lenz named Mona's Dream about the life story of Mona Mahmudnizhad.

Sarah Bernhardt, the best known French actress of her day, asked two of her contemporary authors, Catulle Mendès and Henri Antoine Jules-Bois, to write a play about Tahirih and the Babis for her to portray on stage. Catulle Mendes wrote in Le Figaro that it was after reading Les Religions et les Philosophies dans l´Asie centrale by Arthur de Gobineau that he had the idea to write a drama about Tahéreh Qurrat al-`Ain.

In 2015, during the Adelaide Fringe, Delia Olam co-wrote and staged a one-woman play "Just let the wind untie my perfumed hair", based on Tahirih's final days as seen through several eyewitnesses. Some of Tahirih's poetry, in English translation, was sung to cello or dulcimer accompaniment.

Shabnam Tolouei Iranian actress and filmmaker living in France, has made a documentary of 67 minutes about the life of Tahirih Qurratul'Ayn, in April 2016. The film, called Dust-Flower-Flame, is in Persian language with English and French subtitles.

Russell Garcia and Gina Garcia have composed a musical drama titled The Unquenchable Flame about Táhirih's life, with Tierney Sutton in the role of Táhirih.

In 1990, playwright, singer, and actress, Tadia Rice began a ten-year tour of the musical drama, "A Woman and Her Words: The Story of Tahirih". Covering numerous cities in the United States, and performing at the Victoria Theatre in Grahamstown, South Africa; Botswana, Swaziland, and more. She and co-composer Ellis Hall competed for ten Grammy nominations in 2000 with two music productions, "Solace of the Eyes: The Songs of Tahirih" and "A Woman and her Words: The Story of Tahirih" stage play soundtrack.

== See also ==
- List of Iranian women writers and poets
