= Mohammad Taqi Baraghani =

Iranian Shia cleric (d. 1847)

Mohammad Taqi Baraghani (Persian: ملا محمدتقی برغانی, Arabic: محمد تقي البرغاني; died 25 October 1847), was a prominent Shiʻa cleric in Qajar Iran, who established himself as a leading ʿālem of the city of Qazvin. Baraghani is known for being the first cleric to declare takfir (c. 1822) against Shaykh Ahmad al-Ahsá'í, the founder of the Shaykhi school, and subsequently became the leading opponent of Shaykhism in Iran.

He pursued education in Iran and Ottoman-ruled Iraq, and accompanied his teacher Mohammad-Ali Tabatabai in 1826 on the jihad that had been declared against the Russian Empire during the Russo-Persian War (1826-1828). At some point thereafter, Baraghani is known to have had a disagreement with the Qajar shah Fath-Ali Shah (r. 1797–1834) in the capital Tehran, after which he returned to Qazvin. There, Baraghani obtained a reputation for being one of the foremost preachers of his day.

Baraghani's niece Fatemeh (nicknamed Qorrat-ol-Ayn), rose to become a prominent Bábi leader. Due to Baraghani's increased rejection of Shaikhism and Bábism he was killed, seemingly by three Bábis, in the mosque he had built in Qazvin. He was subsequently bestowed with the title shahid-e sāles ("the third martyr") with his tomb remaining prominent in Qazvin until this day.

== Works ==
His best-known work is Majāles al-Mottaqīn on the sufferings of the imams. His brother, Mohammad Saleh Baraghani, wrote numerous works on this particular theme.

== Sources ==
- MacEoin, D. M. (1988). "BARAḠĀNĪ, MOḤAMMAD-TAQĪ". In Yarshater, Ehsan (ed.). Encyclopædia Iranica. Vol. III/7: Banān–Bardesanes. London and New York: Routledge & Kegan Paul. p. 740. ISBN 978-0-71009-119-2.
