= Karim Khan Kermani =

Self-appointed leader of the Shaykhi community

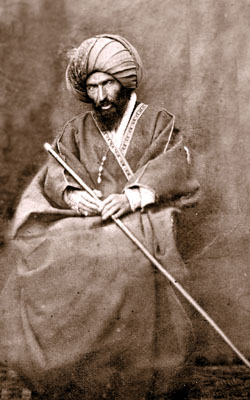
Karim Khan Kermani

Ḥājī Mīrzā Moḥammad-Karīm Khān-e Kermānī (1810–1873), was an Iranian Twelver Shia scholar. He was the third leader of the Kermani Shaykhi community. After the death of his mentor, Sayyid Kazim Rashti, Kermani dedicated himself to the promotion of the teachings of Shaykh Ahmad and Sayyid Kazim. He is believed to be among the first Shaykhi scholars to have rejected the messianic claims of the Báb. He wrote a dozen of anti-Babi books, one such being Risāla izhāq al-bāṭil fī radd al-bābiyya (The Crushing of Falsehood in Refutation of Bābism).

Although he claimed to be nothing except an expositor of the teachings of Shaykh Ahmad and Sayyid Kazim, Kermani has to be considered an original thinker in his own right.
