= Tafsir Shobar =

- Author: Abdullah Shubbar
- Original title: تفسير شبر
- Language: Arabic
- Subject: Quranic exegesis
- Genre: Islamic literature
- Publication date: 19th century
- Publication place: Iraq
- Pages: 2 volumes

Tafsir Shobar is a 19th-century Arabic exegesis of the Qur'an written by Sayyid Abdullah b. Muhammad Rida Hosseini Kazimi (1775–1826CE). The author was born in Najaf, Iraq, spent some time in Shiraz, Iran and died in the city of Kazemain, Iraq. His work follows a traditional methodology for exegesis. The book has been called Safat Al-Tafäsir, Al-Javäher Al-Samin Fi Tafsir Al-Qur'an Al-Mobin, Al-Kabir, Al-Vasit, and Al-Vajiz.

== Structure ==
The book is in two volumes. The first volume covers from the beginning of Qur'an up to Surah Yusuf. The second volume starts at Surah ar-Ra'd and goes through to the end of Qur'an. A copy of the manuscript from the author's time is available in Qom in Sayyid Mar'ashi Najafi's library. The author refers to his methodology as mazji which can be categorized as the traditional method, relying on hadiths. and in paperback.

== See also ==
- Qur'an
- Qur'anic exegesis (Tafsir)
- List of Qur'anic exegesis
