= Mohammad Saleh Baraghani =

Iranian mujtahid (b. 1753)

Mohammad Saleh Baraghani (Persian: محمدصالح برغانی; born 1753) was one of three or four brothers from Baraghan who all established themselves as leading mujtahids in Qazvin. Mohammad Saleh was an Usuli Twelver Shi'i mujtahid. He opened the Salehiyya Madrasa in Qazvin in 1817; it soon gained prominence. As many as 700 students attended it. The madrasa also had a women's section.

Mohammad Saleh's older brother Mohammad Taqi was also a fervent Usuli. Against common practice, Mohammad Taqi took money for issuing legal opinions and putting them into writing. The younger of the brothers, Mulla Ali, was closer to Shaykhism in his beliefs.

Mohammad Saleh married Amineh Salehi, sister of an influential Shaykhi alim, Abd al-Wahhab Sharif Qazvini (d. 1853), imam of the Shah Mosque in Qazvin. Baraghani's wife as well as his four daughters studied in the Salehiyya. His oldest daughter Fatimah, better known as Táhirih, was one of the most reputed religious scholars and poets of 19th century Iran. She eventually turned towards Bábism and was eventually executed for her rejection of orthodox Twelver faith. His other daughters, Marziye, Robabeh and Khadija Sultan, also became religious authorities, though none was as prominent as Fatimah.

Mohammad Saleh Baraghani is remembered for his interpretations of the Qur'an, his eulogies of the tragedies of Karbala, his zeal for the execution of punishments, and active opposition to the consumption of wine.
