= Salehiye School =

Historic religious school in Qazvin, Iran

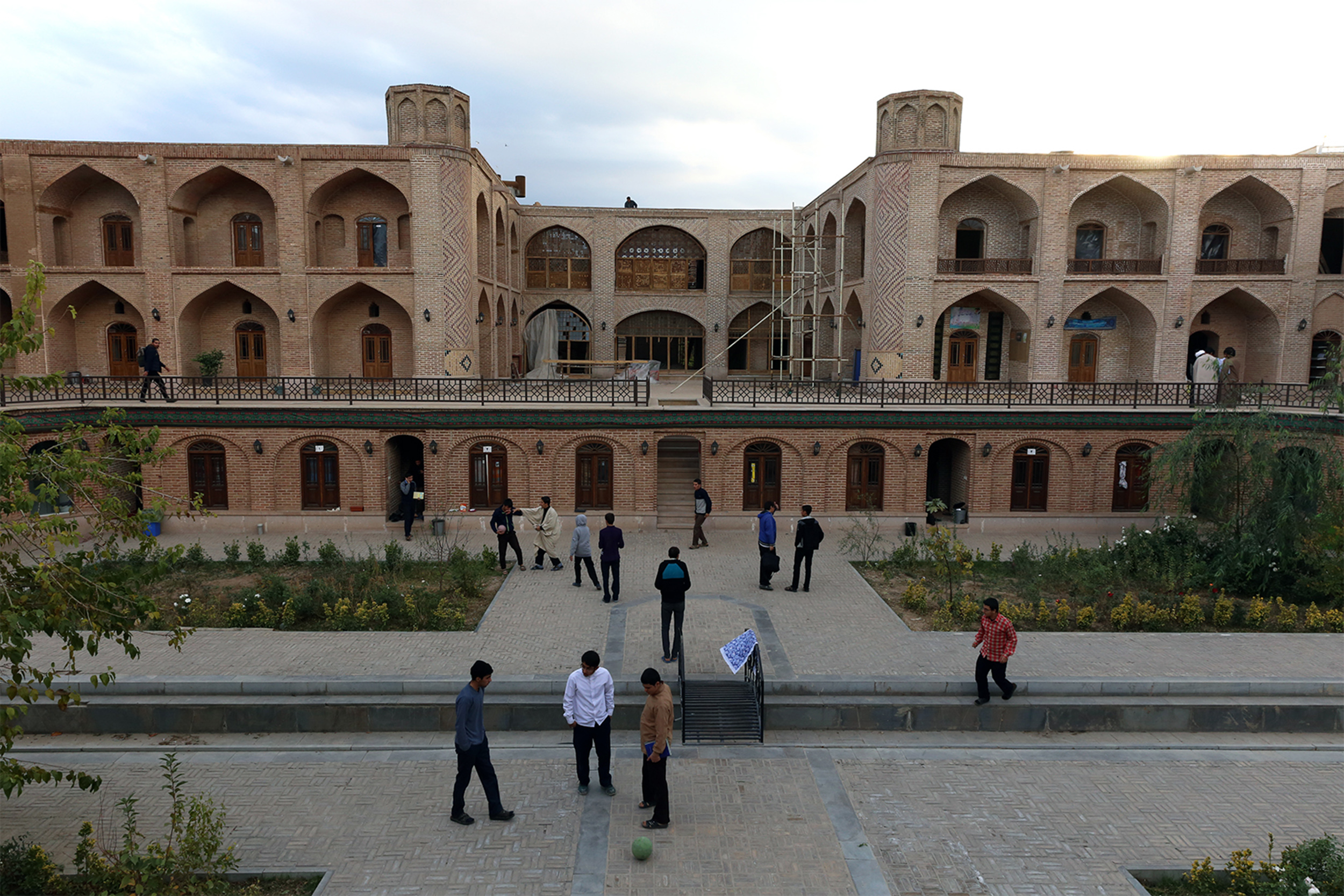
- Location: Qazvin, Iran

History
- Built: Qajar era

The Salehiye School (Persian: مدرسه صالحیه) is a historic building in Qazvin, Iran. Built in the first half of the 19th century by Mohammad Saleh Baraghani, it was one of the most important Shia religious schools in Qajar Iran. Having more than 700 students, it trained many notable figures such as Jamal ad-Din Asadabadi and Seyed Ashrafedin Hosseini.

== Gallery ==
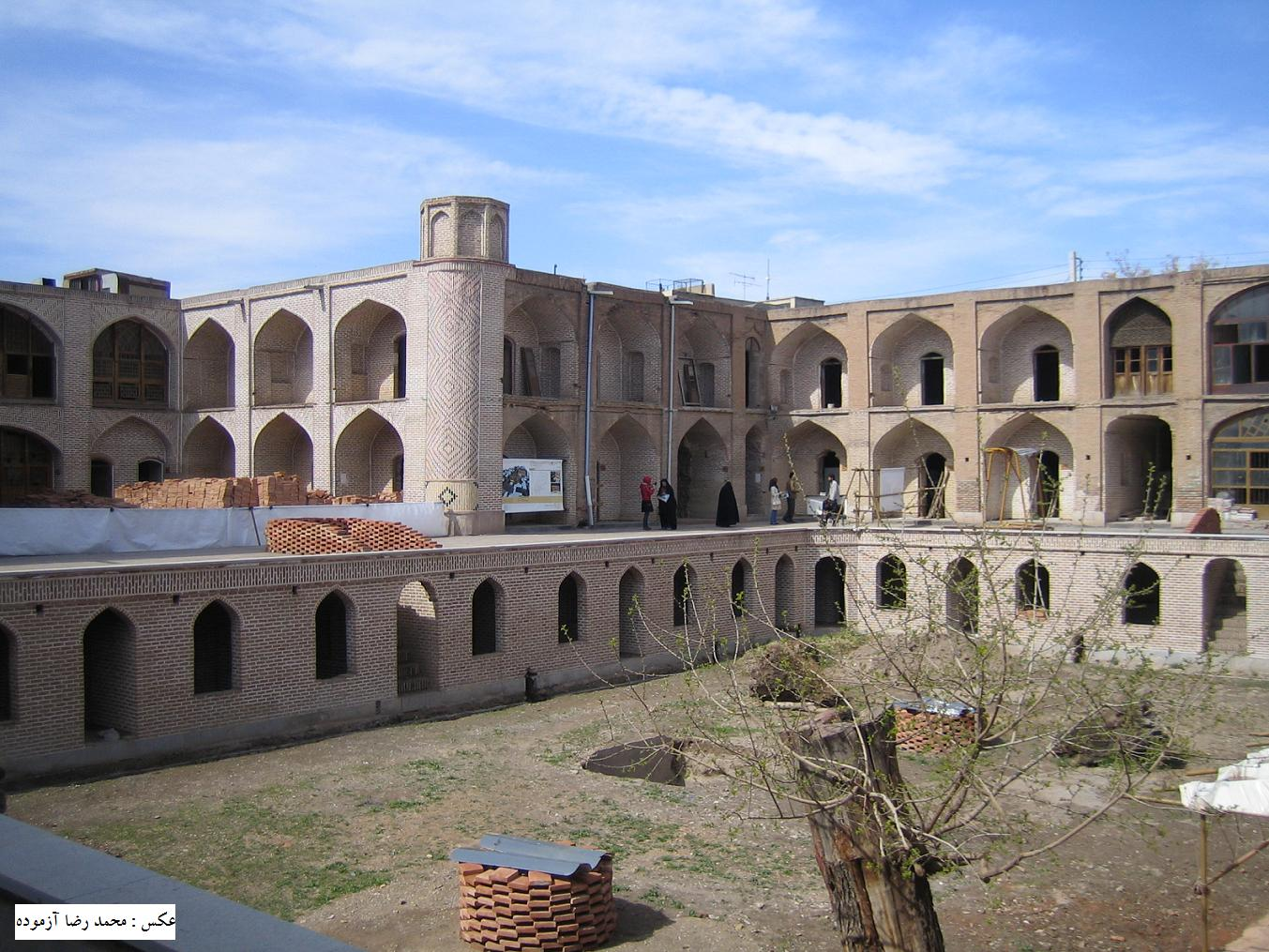

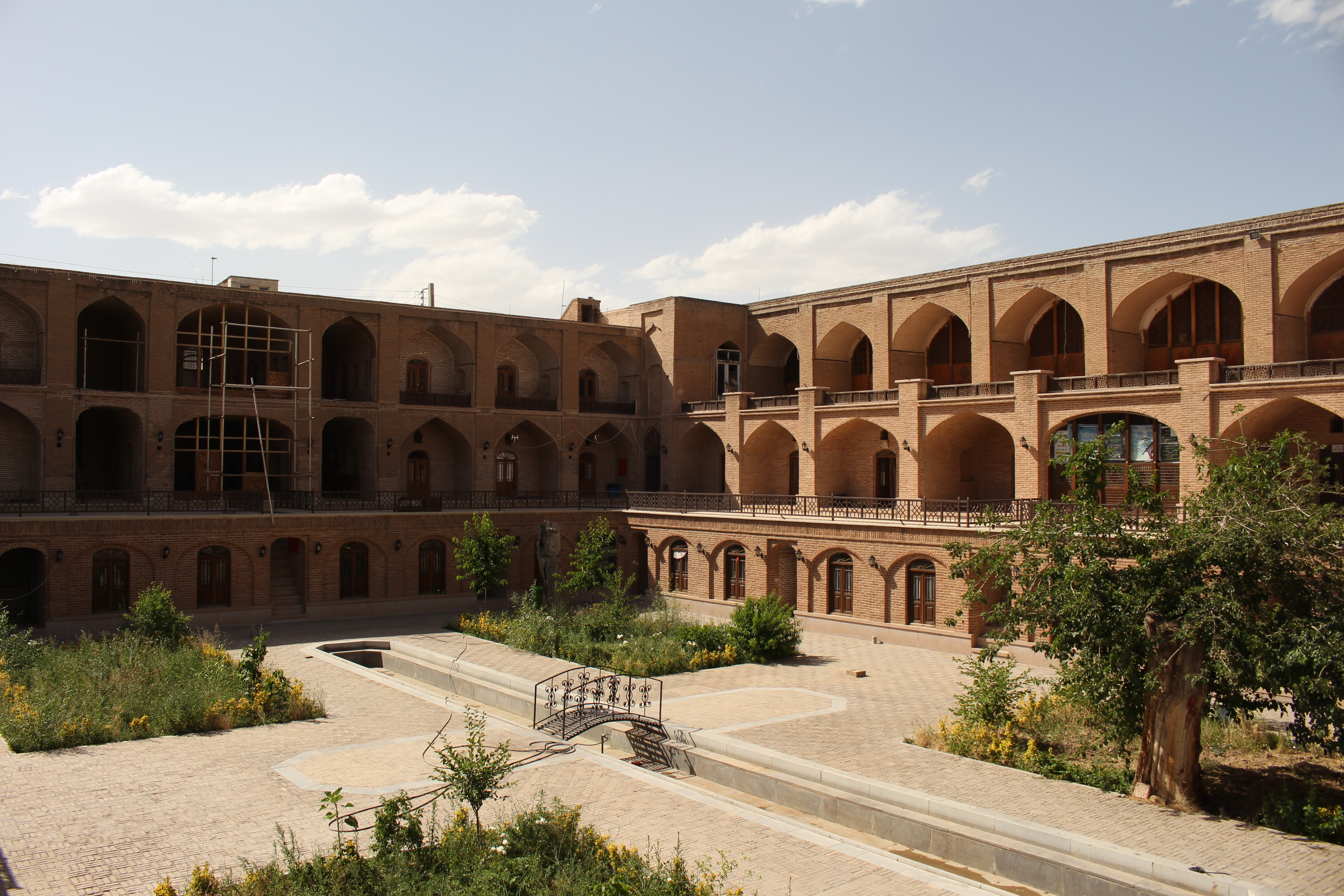

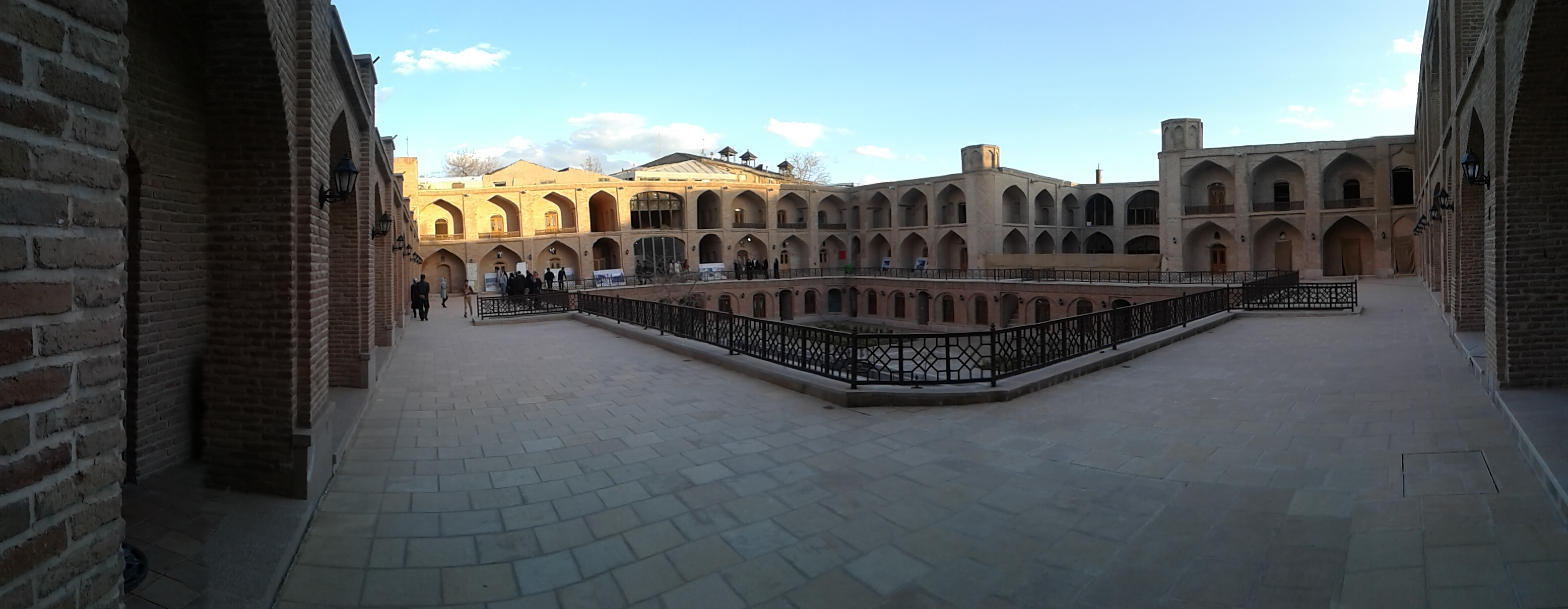

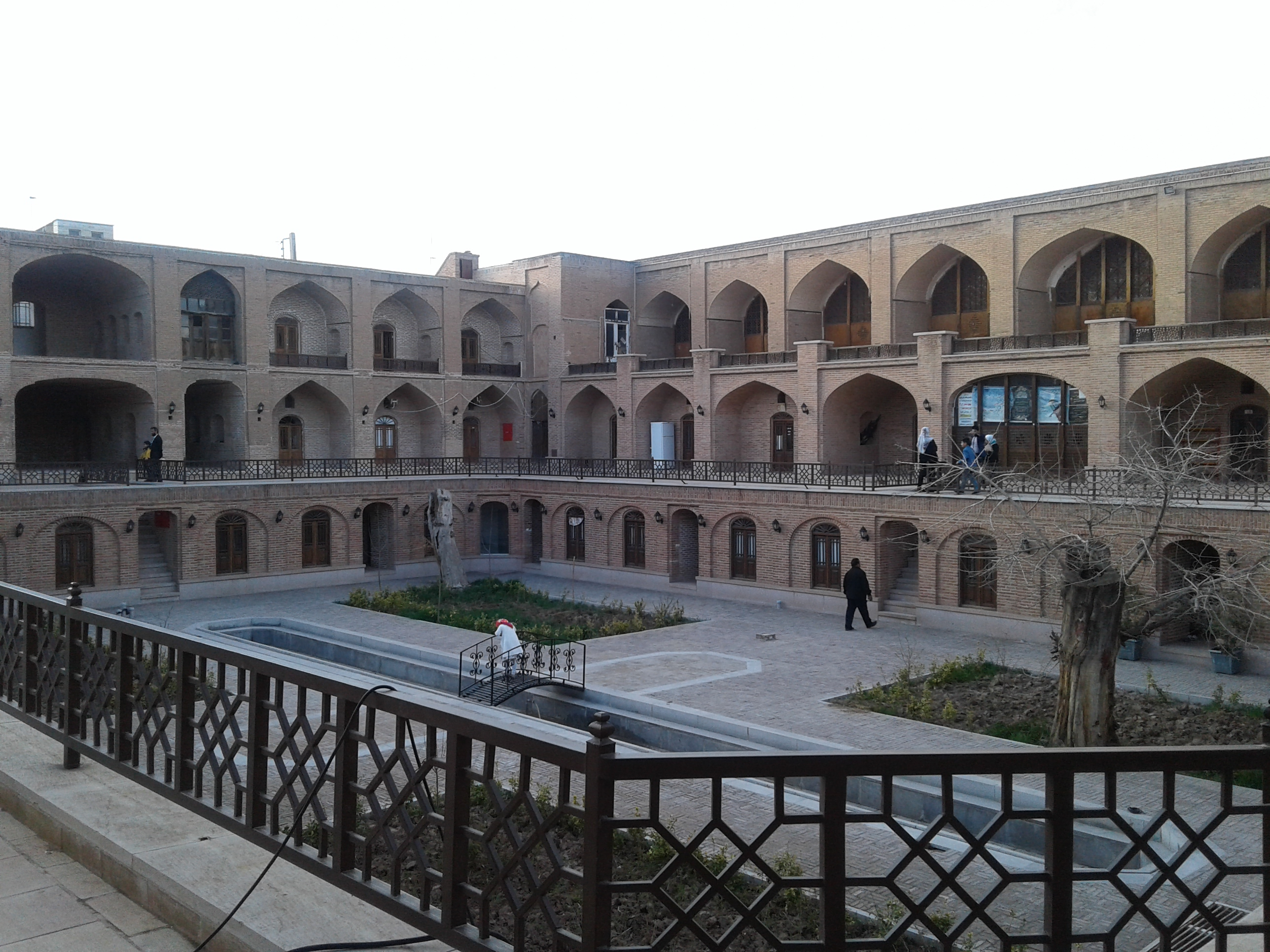
