= Abdullah Shubbar =

Iraqi faqih

Sayyid Abdullah Shobbar
- السيد عبد الله شبر
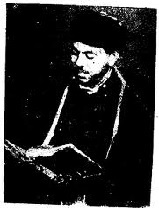

Personal life
- Born: 1775 Najaf, Iraq
- Died: 1827 (aged 51–52) Kadhimiya, Iraq

Religious life
- Religion: Islam
- Denomination: Twelver Shīʿā

Sayyid Abdullah bin Muhammad Ridha Al Shubbar al-Husayni al-Kazemi (Arabic: عبد الله بن محمد رضا شبر الحسيني الكاظمي; 1188 AH – 1242 AH), was an Iraqi Twelver Shia scholar, cleric, speaker, jurist and interpreter of the Quran, famous for his book in exegesis of the Qur'an Tafsir Shobar and also his book Al-Akhlaq (The Moral). He was active in Islamic sciences such as jurisprudence, fundamentals, hadith, interpretation, philosophy, language, literature and history.

== Early life and education ==
The Al Shubbar family was one of the ancient houses of knowledge in Hillah, Iraq. His family moved to city of Najaf to study Islam. He was born in 1188 AH (1774-1775 AD) in Najaf, and later moved to and settled in Kadhimiya.

His lineage goes to the 4th Shiite Imam, Zayn al-'Abidin. His full name, reflecting his lineage, was Abdullah bin Muhammad Ridha bin Shubar bin Hassan bin Ahmed bin Ali bin Ahmed bin Nasser al-Din bin Shams al-Din Muhammad bin Najm al-Din bin Hassan bin Muhammad bin Hamza bin Ahmed bin Ali bin Talha bin Hussein bin Ali bin Omar bin Hassan Al-Aftas bin Ali bin Zain Al-Abidin Ali bin Al-Hussein bin Ali bin Abi Talib.

== Teachers ==
He studied under his father, Sayyid Muhammad Redha, as well as Sayyid Muhsin al-Araji al-Kazimi. He learned ijtihad from Sheikh Ja'far Kashif al-Ghita and Shaykh Ahmed bin Zain al-Din al-Ahsaei.

== Jurisprudence ==
He was one of opponents of the Akhbari school in that era. He defended the Usuli school through his books on jurisprudence.

== In the views of the scholars ==
- Abbas Qomi referred to him in his book Al-Kuna wa al-Alqab "as a keen knowledgeable scholar and high-ranking scholar of hadiths".
- Al-Sayyed Mohsen al-Amin referred to him in his book Ayan al-Shia: "His conditions is muhadith (expert in science of hadith), He is the author of a lot of writing and authoring". Also in the book he referred to the writings of contemporaries and those familiar with his books whose referred to him such as the author of Dar al-Salaam and Sheikh Abd al-Nabi al-Kazimi (the author of Takmilat al-Rijal) student of Sayyid Abdullah Shubbar".

== Works ==
He wrote approximately 70 book in about 100 volumes, which is why he came to be known as "the second Majlisi".

The most prominent of his books include:

- Tafsir Shobar (Quran commentary).
- Al Akhalq (The Moral).
- Al jawhar al Thamin fi Sharh al Kitab al Mubin - 6 parts (Quran commentary).
- Teb al Aema (Islamic issues).
- Irshad al Mustabsir fi al Estekharat (Dua).
- Al Slook ela Allah (Ethics and Irfan)
- Haq al Yaqeen fi Marefat Usul al Deen (Islamic theology)
- Ahsan al Taqweem (Dua).
- Al Anwar al Lamea fi Sharh al Ziara al Jamia (Dua).
- Nukhbat al Sharhin fi Sharh Nahj al Balagha (Hadith).
- Sharh al Mahaga fi Sharh Khutbat al Luma (Sermon explanation of Fatima al Zahraa) (Hadith).

== Death ==
He died in the year 1242 AH (1826 - 1827 AD) at age 52. He was buried in a chamber in the Shrine of Kadhimiya in the city of Kadhimiya next to his father Sayyid Muhammad Reda.
