= Kazim Rashti =

Successor of Shaykh Ahmad al-Ahsa'i, leader of the Shaykhí movement

Siyyid Kāzim Rashtī
- سید کاظم رشتی
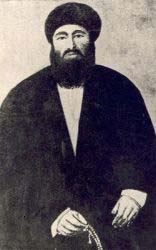

Personal life
- Born: 1793 Rasht, Qajar Iran
- Died: 1843 (aged 49–50) Karbala, Ottoman Empire (present-day Iraq)
- Buried: Imam Hussein Shrine
- Era: Qajar dynasty

Religious life
- Religion: Islam
- Denomination: Shia
- Jurisprudence: Ja'fari (Shaykhi)
- Creed: Twelver

Muslim leader
- Influenced by: Shaykh Ahmad, Abdullah Shubbar
- Influenced: Báb, Táhirih, Mullá Husayn, Quddús

Siyyid Kāẓim bin Qāsim al-Ḥusaynī ar-Rashtī (Arabic: سيد كاظم بن قاسم الحسيني الرﺷتي; 1793–1843), commonly known as Siyyid Kāzim Rashtī (Persian: سید کاظم رشتی), was the son of Siyyid Qasim of Rasht, a town in northern Iran. He was appointed as the successor of Shaykh Ahmad al-Ahsa'i, and led the Shaykhi movement until his death.

He came from a family of well known merchants. He was a Shaykhi scholar who told his students about the coming of the Mahdi and the "Masih" (the return of Christ) and taught them how to recognize them. After his death in 1843, many of his students spread out around Asia, Europe and Africa for the search.

Upon his death he was buried near the tomb of Imam Hossein in Karbala.

== Works ==
=== Sharh al-qasída al-lámíya ===
One of Siyyid Kazim's most important works is a 16,000 verse commentary on an Arabic ode. The text itself has not much to do with the actual content of the poem. The commentary is well known for Kazim's depiction of the many levels, regions and inhabitants of the spiritual universe depicted as a "multi-faceted celestial, cosmic city". It also includes discussion surrounding "the curtain of the city of knowledge" and its symbolism, the inception of an era of spirituality and "inward realities" as opposed to the "outward observances" and laws of the past, allusions to the significance of the word Baha (Splendour/Glory), as well as interpretations of Noah's Ark and the light verse.

== Successorship ==
On the death of Siyyid Kazim on 31 December 1843, some Shaykhis went on to become Babis, some of whom later became Baháʼís, and the rest split into three factions. Baháʼí sources claim that Ḥājī Mīrzā Muḥammad-Karīm Khān-i-Kermānī declared himself as the successor to Siyyid Kazim.

It is also reported in the Baháʼí sources that before dying, instead of appointing a successor, he sent his disciples out to find the Promised One. One of his most noted followers, Mullá Husayn said:

"Our departed teacher insistently exhorted us to forsake our homes, to scatter far and wide, in quest of the promised Beloved... Regarding the features of the Promised One, he told us that He is of a pure lineage, is of illustrious descent, and of the seed of Fatimah. As to His age, He is more than twenty and less than thirty. He is endowed with innate knowledge. He is of medium height, abstains from smoking, and is free from bodily deficiency."

(quoted in Nabil-i-Aʻzam's The Dawn-Breakers", or "Nabil's Narrative", translated by Shoghi Effendi, p. 57)

In 1844 Mullá Husayn, after meeting the Siyyid ʻAlí-Muhammad (the Báb) in Shiraz accepted him as the Mahdi.

=== The Báb's relationship to Siyyid Káẓim ===
The Shaykhis had previously met Siyyid ʻAlí-Muhammad in Karbila' when he attended the meetings of Siyyid Káẓim. There is disagreement over the amount of time Siyyid Mírzá ʻAlí-Muhammad stayed in Karbila' and the frequency of his attending Siyyid Káẓim's lectures; Baháʼí sources state that the Báb only occasionally attended the meetings, while sources more critical to the Baháʼí Faith state that he stayed in Karbila for a year or two and learned the Shaykhi teachings. In the Bab's own writings, however, he refers to the Shaykhi leader as his teacher. Some statements include:

- E.G. Browne wrote that the Báb was in Karbila for two months meeting Siyyid Kazim occasionally:
  "He [the Báb] proceeded at some time antecedent to the year A.H. 1259 (in which year Siyyid Kázim died) to Karbilá, where he resided for some time (two months, according to the Táríkh-i-Jadíd), occasionally attending the lectures of Hájí Siyyid Kázim of Resht"
  (E.G. Browne, Notes in the Traveller's Narrative)

"One day the circle of those who sat at the feet of Seyyid Kázim was augmented by a fresh arrival. The newcomer, who took his seat modestly by the door in the lowest place, was none other than Mírzá 'Alí Muhammad, who, impelled by a pious desire to visit the Holy Shrines, had left his business at Bushire to come to Kerbelá. During the next few months the face of the young Shírází became familiar to all the disciples of Siyyid Kázim, and the teacher himself did not fail to notice and appreciate the earnest but modest demeanour of the youthful stranger."

(Babism by E G Browne in Religious Systems of the World, pp. 335).

- Baháʼí sources state that the Báb went on pilgrimage to Iraq for 7 months, to the cities of Najaf and Karbila. But they deny that a close bond developed with Siyyid Kázim.
  "According to Mírzá Abu'l-Faḍl of Gulpaygan, He journeyed to the holy cities of 'Iraq in the spring of 1841, stayed in 'Iraq for nearly seven months and returned to His 'native province of Fars' in the autumn of that year.
  ...
  "While in Karbila the Bab visited Siyyid Kazim-i-Rashti and attended his discourses. But these occasional visits did not and could not make Him a pupil or disciple of Siyyid Kazim. His adversaries have alleged that He sat at the feet of Siyyid Kazim for months on end to learn from him."
  (H.M. Balyuzi, The Bab – The Herald of the Day of Days, p. 41)
- Amanat presents arguments for and against the Bab being a student of Siyyid Kazim (p140-1). On the one hand Mulla Sadiq Muqaddas states that "...Mir Ali Muhammad Shirazi [the Bab]...is a student of Sayyid Kazim..." and that he (Muqaddas) was introduced to Siyyid Kazim by the Bab. On the other hand, another contemporary, Qatil Karbala'i, who later became a Babi, states that the Bab attended Siyyid Kazim's lectures only two or three times. Amanat argues that the Bab was not in Karbala long enough to fully grasp Siyyid Kazim's teachings; in fact, Muqaddas himself states that once in Karbala, he was asked to teach the Bab, and that he was also determined to convert the Bab to Shaykhism. Amanat asserts that the Bab's reference to Siyyid Kazim as "the revered scholar and my intimate teacher" is a symbolic acknowledgement of their spiritual affinity and not a literal fact.
- ʻAbdu'l-Bahá's wife, Munirih Khanum quotes in her biography her uncle stating:
  "We had often heard in the course of his lectures Haji Siyyid Kazim stating the fact, that the day of the Manifestation was drawing nigh. He admonished us at all times that we must be searching, and be in a state of quest, because the Promised One was living amongst the people, was associating with them; but unfortunately the people were veiled and lived in a state of negligence.
  When we saw the Bab standing with such humility before the Shrine of Imam Hossein, we often wondered if perhaps, he was not the invisible Promised One, who had come to visit the Shrine of his ancestors.
  ...
  During his seclusion in Karbila, he attended now and then the classes of Haji Siyyid Kasem, with a shining and luminous countenance. Whenever he entered the class, Haji Siyyid Kasem would show him the greatest respect and honor."
  (Munirih Khanum quoting her uncle, found in Episodes in the Life of Moneereh Khanum, pp. 11–12)
- In one of the Báb's earliest writings, the Risala fi'l-Suluk, or "Treatise on Spiritual Wayfaring," he mentions the Shaykhi leader by name and refers to him as "my master, my support, my teacher, the pilgrim Siyyid Kazim al-Rashti."
