= Ibn Abi Jumhur al-Ahsa'i =

Mashriqi Islamic scholar and theologian

Sheikh, Allama, Shamsuddin Ibn Abi Jumhur al-Ahsa'i
- ابن أبي جمهور الأحسائي
- Born: Muhammad bin Ali bin Ibrahim Al-Shaybani Al-Ahsai; 1435; Taymiyyah, Eastern Arabia
- Died: 1505 (aged 69–70); Possibly Taymiyyah
- Other name: Abu Jaafar
- Occupations: Muslim scholar, jurist, orator

Education
- Academic advisor: Ali bin Hilal al-Jazaery

Philosophical work
- Era: 1473—1501
- School: Ja'fari jurisprudence, Twelver Shia Islam
- Language: Arabic
- Main interests: fiqh, theology, Shia hadith interpretation
- Notable works: Awali al-Allali, The Majestic Mirror of Mangroves, Laila Amadiyahi: The Lost Origins of Fiqh in the Hadiths, Greater Journeys: On the Fundamentals of Religion

Mohammed bin Ali bin Ibrahim Al-Shaybani Al-Bakri Al-Ahsa’i (Arabic: محمد بن علي بن إبراهيم الشَّيباني البكري الأحسائي, commonly known as Ibn Abī Jumhūr al-Aḥsā'ī Arabic: بـابن أبي جمهور الأحسائي; 1435–1505) was an influential Shia Muslim scholar who adhered to the Ja'fari school of Islamic jurisprudence.

He was born in the village of Taymiyyah in Eastern Arabia (modern-day Al Hofuf, Al-Ahsa Governorate) during the reign of the first Jabrid Emir, and was raised in prosperity by his father Zain al-Din Ali and grandfather Ibrahim, both Shi’ite scholars. Ibn Abi Jumhur studied first with them before traveling on to Najaf in what is now Iraq to study with Sharaf al-Din Hassan bin Abdulkarim Fattal, who gave him permission to transmit hadith. In 1472, the young postulant went on Hajj and met Ali bin Hilal al-Jazaery in Jabal Amel, giving the latter the same permission. Returning for a while to Eastern Arabia, Ibn Abi Jumhur left for Iraq once more before moving on to Mashhad in Greater Khorasan, where he continued to write and teach. He gained renown for his debates with Ahmad bin Yahya al-Taftazani, a Sunni jurist of the Shafiʽi school. Ibn Abi Jumhur traveled extensively throughout the rest of his life between Persia and Iraq (both governed then by the Timurid Empire as well as his native land, mostly staying in Mashhad, Najaf, and Al-Ahsa respectively. All the while he extensively taught and wrote treatises and critiques on fiqh (jurisprudence), rhetoric, philosophy, ethics, theology, and hadith. He is best-known for his theory of Shi’ite hadith, essentially summed up as endorsing “adding, whenever possible, over subtraction” in interpretation. It is not clear when or where he died.

== Ancestors ==
His full name is Shams al-Din Abu Jaafar Muhammad bin Zain al-Din Abi al-Hasan Ali bin Husam al-Din Ibrahim bin Hassan bin Ibrahim bin Abi Jamhur al-Shaybani al-Bakri al-Hasa’i. His father, Zain al-Din Ali, and his grandfather, Husam al-Din, were both scholars and belonged to the prominent Abi Jumhur family. This clan was a branch in Al-Ahsa of the Banu Shayban, itself a scion of the Banu Bakr; the Abi Jumhur are considered ancestors of the Al-Aithan family by scholar Jawad al-Ramadan. In his time, Ibn Abi Jumhur was also known as Al-Hasawi.

== Biography ==
Ibn Abi Jumhur was born in the village of Taymiyyah in what is now the Al-Ahsa Governorate during the reign of the first Jabrid Emir, probably around 1434 to 1435. He grew up during the region’s golden age under the auspices of his jurist father.

=== Teaching ===
He studied in Al-Ahsa with his father and a number of scholars, including Muhammad bin Musa al-Musawi al-Ahsa’i (his fiqh teacher), Ali bin Muhammad bin Mani, and others. He then went on to finish his studies in Najaf, where he studied with teachers including most notably Hassan bin Abdulkarim al-Fattal al-Najafi. Among the scholars who gave him permission to transmit hadiths were Hazr al-Din al-Awali al-Bahrani, Muhammad ibn Ahmad al-Musawi al-Ahsa’i, and Abdullah bin Fathallah al-Qummi.

After nearly twenty years in Najaf, he left on Hajj to the Hejaz in 1472, following the Shami pilgrimage route. During that time, he stayed in the town of Karak Nuh in Jabal Amel, then under the rule of Mamluk Sultan Qaitbay, where he stayed for a month to study under Bahraini Sheikh Ali bin Hilal al-Jazaery.

=== Travels ===
After finishing his Hajj, Ibn Abi Jumhur returned to his native Al-Ahsa and stayed there awhile until he traveled to Iraq and Khorasan in 1473, along the way writing the letters زاد المسافرين (“Greater Journeys”) and أصول الدين (“Basics of Faith”). When he reached Mashhad, he began training with Muhsin bin Muhammad Al-Radawi Al-Qummi, who commissioned from his student a treatise known as البراهين في شرح زاد المسافرين (“Proofs for Explaining Ibn al-Jazzar’s Zād al-Musāfir”, a medical work known by medieval Latins as Viaticum).

==== Debates with al-Harawi ====
In 1473, during the reign of Timurid Emperor Husayn Bayqara, a famous Sunni-Shi’ite debate was held featuring Ibn Abi Jumhur as defender of the Shi’ite position and a Sunni scholar from the capital of Herat. The three-round debate was held in Tus, near Mashhad, where he Ibn Abi Jumhur was labeled the “Arab speaker” given the lack of Persian Shi’ites to hold that side of the debate at the time. The first and last rounds were held in the house of Mohsen al-Razawi, while the second was held at the Balasar School, a part of the Imam Reza Holy Shrine built on April 27, 1474 during the reign of Sultan Ahmed Mirza that has been used as City Hall since 1989. The first debate centered on Ali’s legitimacy as caliph, the second on “the issue of children of adulterers,” and the third on “deception and defamation with regards to the succession.”

The debates were attended by a number of Shi’ite and Sunni scholars, the former holding Ibn Ani Jumhur to be the victor. Some sources believe the other debater, labeled al-Fadhel al-Harawi, was in fact the Shafi’i jurist Ahmad bin Yahya al-Taftazani, the chief ulema of Herat for 30 years who would be killed along with a number of other Sunni clerics by the founding Safavid Emperor Ismail I in 1510. Pressed to record his arguments, Ibn Abi Jumhur published a book of them, most recently reissued in 2015 as المجادلات في المذهب (“Debates in Doctrine”). Several Persian translations exist, including ones by Nawruz Ali ibn Bastami (in his فردوس التواريخ or “Paradise of Dates”), Jalaluddin Muhammad al-Kashani, and Shah Muhammad Al-Hamdani (written in Nastaliq). Muhammad Ashraf bin Ali al-Sharif al-Husseini published a translation in 1679 during the reign of Suleiman of Persia, as did Ibn Zain Al-Din Al-Alam Al-Asfahani in his book الزهرات الزوية في الروضة البهية (“zawiya in the Basalar School”) during Ramadan on July 14, 1687.

==== 1478 to 1501 ====
Ibn Abi Jumhur continued living in Mashhad near the Imaa Reza Shrine as he studied, taught, and wrote for several years, then returned to Hillah, Iraq, where he wrote an exegesis of Shi’ite advocacy tradition of Zainabia, entitled منية اللبيب في شرح التهذيب (“Intellectual Endeavour to Explain Refinement”), which he finished in May 1478. In 1481, he returned to Al-Ahsa, finishing his book قبس الاقتداء في شرائط الإفتاء والاستفتاء (“A Model for Implementing Fatwas and Referenda”) there and soon moving to Qatif to finish مسلك الإفهام في علم الكلام (“Guide to Rhetoric”). Afterward, he moved to Bahrain (then called Awal), where he dictated his book البوارق المحسنية لتجلي الدرة الجمهورية (“Improved Insights into the Principles of Fiqh”) over four majlis (seminars) ending on March 2, 1483.

After a brief return to Al-Ahsa, he traveled to Mashhad once more, where he completed كاشفة الحال عن أحوال الاستدلال (“Revealing the Case for Conditions of Inference”) on December 2, 1483. He stayed there until early 1484, when he wrote the letter أقل ما يجب على المكلفين من العلم بأصول الدين (“The Least Muslims Should Know about the Fundamentals of Religion”).

Among the towns he visited during his travels from 1485 to 1490 was Diriyah in Najd. In 1487, on a brief return to Taymiyyah, he completed his book, النور المنجي من الظلام في حاشية مسلك الأفهام في علم الكلام (“Enlightening Footnotes on [Al-Sayyid Hasan al-Husayni al-Lawasani’s] Guide to Theology”). That same year, he once again went on Hajj, returning a third time through Iraq and arriving in Najaf in early 1488. After a brief return to Mashhad where he wrote a critique of كتاب بحر الأنساب (“On the Sea of Genealogy”), but it was on a prolonged stay in Najaf that he wrote several books, including المسالك الجماعية في شرح الألفية الشهيدية (“Collected Tracts on Explaining the Millennial Message”) and مجلي مرآة المنجي (“The Majestic Mirror of Mangroves”).

In 1489, he left for Mashhad once more, where he finished the books تبييض (“Absolution”) and a commentary on the local monuments. Then he traveled to Gorgan (then called Astarabad) to authorize his student Muhammad bin Saleh al-Gharawi al-Hilli in the nearby village of Qalqan, along with another named Jalaluddin Bahram. Ibn Abi Jumhur stayed in Astarabad for two or three years and seemed to have divided his time between there and Mashhad until 1497. That year, he traveled to Medina to complete his work معين الفكر في شرح الباب الحادي عشر (“Some Thoughts on Explaining the Eleventh Surah”). Afterwards, he returned to Iraq and lived in Hillah, where he authorized Ali bin Qasim bin Athaqa Al-Hilli on January 28, 1501, the last date clearly mentioned in the sources as connected to Ibn Abi Jumhur.

=== Death ===
Sources differ as to the time of his death, but according to scholar Hashim Muhammad al-Shakhs, he likely died around 1505 in his native Al-Ahsa, possibly at the age of 72. Some Persian sources differ and claim that he died in Mashhad and was buried in the Imam Reza Shrine.

== Work ==
Ibn Abi Jumhur was considered a leading Shi’ite Muslim scholar of his time and was well-versed in fiqh, philosophy, logic, rhetoric, and hadith interpretation. According to Kamil Mustafa Shaybi, Ibn Abi Jumhur al-Ahsa’i was the next iteration of the thought of Maitham Al Bahrani and Haydar Amuli and a model for that of Shaykh Ahmad. He was a writer and poet as well as a judge, and a few verses remain in his book, مجموعة المواعظ والنصائح والحكم (“A Collection of Sermons, Advice, and Judgments”). He interpreted many Sunni hadiths that conformed to Shi’ite tradition.

=== Philosophy ===
Ibn Abi Jumhur is perhaps best remembered for promulgating a key doctrine of Shi’ite scholarship, the maxim that “synthesis, however possible, is more appropriate than removal from canon.” This theory holds that wherever multiple narratives on the word of the Twelve Imams conflict but are clearly transmitted and can be reconciled, they should be combined rather than favoring one tradition over another so as not to give undue weight to fame, friends’ work, contravention, or personal preference. If this process is not followed and a scholar chooses a favorite interpretation, important truths may be overlooked or indecision may block them from acting on it. As he put it in his book, عوالي اللَّئالي (“Awali al-Allali”):

For every two events that appear to be contradictory, you must first search for their meaning and the qualities of the connotations of their terms.

Then he adds a point from the hadith of the Maqbula of Umar ibn Hanzala (from a disciple of Ja’far al-Sadiq):

If you are not able to do [that reconciliation] or if neither stands out to you, then return to the hadith so you work with the renowned if opposed by the obscure. If the figures are equal in renown, work from them both as narrators and follow your own judgment. If they are equal in that, then see what common doctrine would hold and put that first.

=== Theology ===
Farhad Daftary wrote that Ibn Abi Jumhur tried to integrate Sufism into Shi’ite thought, especially in his book المُجلي (“The Exile”), which merges Twelver Shi’a theology, Avicenna’s philosophy, Yahya ibn Habash Suhrawardi’s Illuminationism, and Ibn Arabi’s Sufi school. Ibn Abi Jumhur wrote books on rhetoric, including زاد المسافرين (“Zad Al-Musafir”), but المُجلي took him a long time. He started it as زاد المسافرين (“Understanding the Way”), a theological guide he wrote in his youth in Najaf, to which his students lobbied him to write a footnote in 1488 called النور المنجي من الظلام حاشية مسلك الأفهام (“Enlightenment Lining the Path of Understanding”). On his return to Najaf in 1489, he revised it and re-published it in 1490 as مجلي مرآة المنجي, including “the divine wisdom, precious secrets of secular sciences, the essence of annunciation, and the end of levels of hoped-for perfection.” Considered a theological treatise that was his life’s work, المُجلي is considered an encyclopedia of most well-known topics of the age that primarily focuses on philosophy in Al-Bahrani’s image with Amuli’s style. The book is in two volumes, the first expounding on the Tawhid and the second on studies of verbs on the grounds that theology is “in fact divided into them.”

Ibn Abi Jumhur revered al-Bahrani as “the greatest scholar and the deepest intellect,” though he relied on Allamah Al-Hilli for insights on etiology and epistemology. “However, he did not rely on Shi’ite jurists and their official representatives to the same degree, though he once mentioned Al-Shaykh Al-Mufid.

Ibn Abi Jumhur’s goal was to integrate Sufi and Shi’ite thought, and he cited the arguments and research of Amuli. He considered “Sharia, the method, and the truth, [to be] synonymous names true to the one truth of the Muslim law.” He cited to this end Amuli’s البحر الخضم (“The Great Ocean”), hoping to combine the Ash’ari and the Mu’tazila theological schools with philosophy and mysticism to create a single monotheistic belief framework based on Sufi and ascetic precepts.

For Ibn Abi Jumhur, monotheism was first and foremost about the unity that is:

Proof that this world has but one maker…and the theologians’ terminology for singling out the Almighty Truth from the entire multitude of attributes and actions within it and the Sufi insistence on the pure singularity both prove the principles and organization embedded in His all-encompassing greatness.

Ibn Abi Jumhur’s theological intention was to form a new sect or at least to reform Shia Islam to become an all-inclusive ecumenical doctrine. The Shi’a sect alone was not a large enough platform for his opinions, and he pointed out areas where Shi’ites lacked curiosity and educated ulama, so he wanted to bring it up to date with the spirit of the time without disturbing its key principles.

=== Teaching ===
Ibn Abi Jumhur was a very influential teacher and authorized several students to narrate hadith, including Jamal al-Din Hassan bin Ibrahim Ibn Abi Shabana al-Bahrani and Muhsin bin Muhammad al-Razawi al-Qummi, the latter his closest student and an associate from his last years at Imam Reza Shrine. Other notable disciples include Sharaf al-Din Mahmoud bin Alaa al-Din al-Talqani, who studied fiqh, hadith, biographical evaluation, and rhetoric for many years. Among other graduates were Rabi` bin Juma al-Ghazi al-Huwaizi, Jalal al-Din Bahram al-Astarabadi, Ata Allah bin Mu`in al-Din al-Sarw al-Asturabadi, Ali bin Qasim (known as Ibn Azaqa al-Hilli), Hussein al-Tuni, and Abdul Wahhab ibn Ali al-Husayni Alastabadi.

== Criticism ==
Ibn Abi Jumhur was criticized for his Shi’ism and accused of exaggeration by such scholars as Yedikuleli Seyyid 'Abdullah Efendi in his رياض العلماء (“Scholars of Riyadh”). Other scholars defended him, including Nematollah Jazayeri, Mirza Husain Noori Tabarsi, and Shahab ud-Din Mar’ashi Najafi. His textual magnanimity in عوالي اللَّئالي was also said by some sources to “mix the wheat with the chaff.” Al-Mar’ashi wrote a letter on September 19, 1982, which he included in a forward to his edition of عوالي اللَّئالي, therein rebutting these criticisms.

== Legacy ==
A mosque in Taymiyyah is attributed to Ibn Abi Jumhur’s time and includes an engraving in the mihrab dated to 1407, when his father Ali and grandfather Ibrahim would have prayed there. The text on the engraving is preserved and was inlaid up top, stating the shahada (the credo that “there is no God but Allah and Muhammad is his Prophet”).

In 2013, the Ibn Abi Jumhur Heritage Society was founded in Qom as a non-profit dedicated to historic preservation.

== Publications ==
Ibn Abi Jumhur left a large body of work in many fields, most of which are in Iranian libraries and many of which were printed or at least survive in manuscripts. A bibliography was published in 2013 by Abdullah Ghafrani. Among the most important works are:

- أسرار الحج (“Secrets of Hajj,” 1496)
- الأقطاب الفقهية والوظائف الدينية على مذهب الإمامية أو الأقطاب الفقهية على مذهب الإمامية (“Judicial Principles and Religious Functions According to the Doctrine of the Ulama, or Jurists Explaining the Rules of Fiqh in the Doctrine of the Imamate,” including 46 chapters on the disciplines, practices, and outcomes of jurisprudence, completed on December 25, 1491)
- الأنوار المشهدية في شرح الرسالة البرمكية (“Enlightening the Message of the Barmakids,” on the meaning of daily prayer in fiqh, translated by his student Moshen al-Razawi into Persian)
- بداية النهاية (“Beginning of the End,” on the illumination of wisdom)
- البوارق المحسنية لتجلّي الدرة الجمهورية (“Improved Insights into the Principles of Fiqh,” a March 2, 1483 work of philosophy on Usul al-Fiqh)
- التحفة الحسينية في شرح الرسالة الألفية (“The Husayni Perspective on the Millennial Message”)
- تحفة القاصدين في معرفة اصطلاح المحدثين (“Observations on the Convention of Muhadditheen”)
- التحفة الكلامية (“Observations on Words,” observations on the Five Pillars of Islam, completed in January 1496)
- Commentaries on Kitab al-Kafi and Man La Yahduruhu al-Faqih
- جمع الجمع (“Collected Multitude,” proofs of the imamate)
- Annotations of تهذيب طريق الوصول إلى علم الأصول (“Notes on Learning the principles of fiqh,” 1491) and عوالي اللَّئالي (“Awali al-Allali,” 1492)
- دُرَر اللَّئالي العمادية في الأحاديث الفقهية (“Laila Amadiyahi: The Lost Origins of Fiqh in the Hadiths,” one of his most important and most famous works, completed in 1494 and a major source in three chapters for أخبار الترغيب على العبادات (“New Draws for Worship”) and وخاتمة في الأخلاقيات (“Conclusions on Ethics”)
- الدُّرَّة المستخرجة من اللُّجَّة في الحكمة (“Pearls of Wisdom,” an Irfan Analysis of Signs and Riddles)
- الرسالة الإبراهيمية في المعارف الإلهية (“The Abrahamic Message in the Divine Knowledge,” 1491)
- رسالة في أحكام الإرث (“Letter on the Provision of Inheritance”)
- الرسالة الجمهورية (“The Message of Fiqh,” a study of the principles of fiqh and an explanation of good omens)
- رسالة في أقل من يجب على المكلفين من العلم بأصول الدين (“A Letter on the Minimum Knowledge of Fundamentals of Religion,” completed on February 22, 1484)
- رسالة في ذكر مستحقي الزكاة، مخطوطة (“Letter on the Entitlement to zakat,” manuscript)
- رسالة في صلاة الجمعة (“Letter on Friday Prayer,” possibly him)
- زاد المسافرين في أصول الدين (“Greater Journeys: On the Fundamentals of Religion,” written on route to Khorasan from his Hajj in 1472)
- الطوالع المحسنية في شرح الرسالة الجمهورية (“Good Portents to Explain the Principles of Fiqh”)
- عروة المستمسكين بأصول الدين (“Button-Holders on the Fundamentals of Religion”)
- عوالي الَّئالي العزيزية في الأحاديث الدينية (“Awali al-Allali: Aziz in the Hadiths,” his most famous work, completed on December 25, 1491, including an introduction, two sections, and a conclusion)
- الفصول الموسية في العبادات الشرعية (“Mosaic Chapters in Religious Law”)
- قبس الاقتداء في شرائط الإفتاء والاستفتا (“A Model for Implementing Fatwa and Referenda,” completed on April 19, 1481)
- كاشفة الحال عن أحوال الاستدلال (“Revealing the Case for Conditions of Inference,” an analysis of how to infer legal costs from religious principles in the principles of fiqh, completed on December 23, 1481)
- كشف البراهين في شرح زاد المسافرين في أصول الدين أو كشف البراهين لشرح زاد المسافرين (“Disclosure of Evidence on Greater Journeys: On the Fundamentals of Religion,” written in Mashhad on May 4, 1474, ISBN 9786144268704)
- مجلي مرآة المنجي (“The Majestic Mirror of Mangroves,” a study of rhetoric, philosophy, and biographical evaluation, one of his most famous books completed in May 1490).
- مجموعة الأخبار والمسائل (“A Collection of News and Issues,” a compilation)
- مجموعة المواعظ والنصائح والحكم (“A Collection of Sermons, Advice, and Judgments”)
- مختصر التحفة الكلامية (“Short Masterpiece”)
- مدخل الطالبيين في أصول الدين (“Student Introduction to the Fundamentals of Religion”)
- المسالك الجامعية في شرح الرسالة الألفية (“University Tracts to Explain the Millennium Message”)
- مسلك الأفهام في علم الكلام (“Guide to the Study of Rhetoric”)
- المعالم السنانية في شرح الرسالة الجُوِينية (“Linguistic Approach to Understanding Al-Juwayni’s Message,” on the principles of fiqh)
- معين الفكر في شرح البادي الحادي عشر (“Some Thoughts on Sharh al-Badi al-Badi,” completed on June 23, 1499, ISBN 9786144262894)
- معين المعين في أصول الدين (“Some Notes on the Fundamentals of Religion,” an explanation of the book of that name)
- مفتاح الفكر لفتح الباب حادي عشر (“Thoughts on the Eleventh Chapter”)
- المقتل (“Killer”)
- نص مناظراته مع العالم الهروي (“Printed Text of his Disputations,” printed)
- موضِّح الدراية لشرح باب البداية (“Intellectual Primer on the Starting Point,” philosophy)
- موضِّح المشكلات لأوائل الإجتهادات (“Explaining the Problems of Early Fiqh”)
- النور المنجي من الظلام في حاشية مسلك الأفهام في علم الكلام (“Enlightening Footnotes to Greater Journeys: On the Fundamentals of Religion,” completed on July 12, 1488)
- النية وذم الوسواس أو رسالة في النية ذم الوسواس فيها (“Intention and Doubt, or How Intention Denounces the Obsessive,” on intention and doubt in acts of worship, completed on January 7, 1485)

== Bibliography ==
- Al-Bahrani, Yahya bin Hussein (2017, editor: Hussein Judi Kazem Al-Jubouri). Souvenir of the Mujtahids, a Message on the Knowledge of the Shi’ite Sheikhs (1st ed.). Karbala: Karbala Center for Studies and Research. Pp. 104-05.
- Department of Islamic Studies, Encyclopedia Center of Islamabad (Visited April 28, 2021). "Ibn Abi Jumhur."
- İslâm Ansiklopedisi (Visited April 28, 2021). "Ibn Abi Jumhur."
- Majlesi, Mohammad-Baqer, (1983). Bihar al-Anwar, intro. Beirut: Al-Wafaa Foundation. Pp. 183-84.
- Najaf, Muhamma Amin (2009). Scholars at the Pleasure of God, A Brief Profile of the Lives of 200 Years (2nd ed.). Qom: Imam Husayn Expeditions. Pp. 143-44. ISBN 9789649211572.
- Al-Saif, Fawzy (2009). من أعلام الإمامية بين الفقيه العماني وآغا بزرك الطهراني (“Notable Figures of the Imamate from the Omani Jurists to Agha Bozorg Tehrani”, 1st ed.). Beirut: Dar el-Safwa. Pp. 115-25.
- Scientific Committee of the Imam All-Sadiq Foundation (2002, editor: Ja’far Sobhani). موسوعة طبقات الفقهاء (“Encyclopedia of Classes of Jurists, 1st ed.). Qom: Imam Al-Sadiq Foundation. Pp. 244-46.
- Al-Shakhs, Hashim Muhammad (1996). أعلام هجر من الماضين والمعاصرين (“Forgotten Greats Past and Present,” 5th ed.). Qom: Umm al-Qura Institute for Research and Publishing. Pp. 250-71.
- Al-Zirikli, Khairuddin (2002). al-Aʻlām, vol. VI (15th ed.). Beirut: Dar El Ilm Lilmalayin. P. 288.
