= Shaykh Ahmad =

Founder of Shaykhí school of Twelver Shiism (1753–1826)

Shaykh Ahmad al-Ahsa'i
- الشيخ أحمد الإحسائي
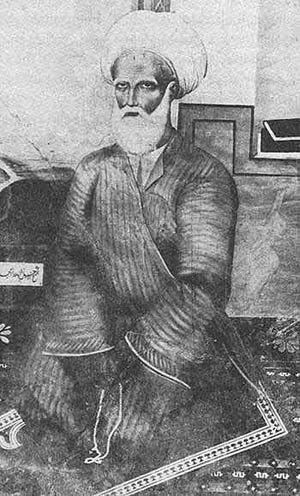
- Ahmad bin Zayn al-Din al-Ahsáʼí

Personal life
- Born: May 1753 Al-Mutayraf, Al-Hasa, Al-Ahsa, Bani Khalid Emirate (modern-day Hofuf, Saudi Arabia)
- Died: 27 June 1826 (aged 72–73) Medina, Ottoman Empire (present-day Saudi Arabia)
- Resting place: Jannaṫ al-Baqīʻ Cemetery, Medina, Hijaz, Saudi Arabia
- Era: Qajar dynasty

Religious life
- Religion: Islam
- Denomination: Twelver Shia
- Movement: Shaykhism

Muslim leader
- Influenced by: Ibn Arabi, Mulla Sadra, Mohsen Fayz Kashani, Muhammad Baqir Behbahani, Yusuf al-Bahrani, Moḥammad Mahdī Baḥr al-ʿUlūm
- Influenced: Hadi Sabzavari, Seyyed Kazem Rashti, Mulla Husayn, Karim Khan Kermani, The Báb, Baháʼu'lláh, Jamāl al-Dīn al-Afghānī

Shaykh Ahmad al-Ahsā'ī (Arabic: شيخ أحمد الأحسائي) (May 1753 ― 27 June 1826) was a prominent Islamic theologian and jurist who founded the influential Shaykhī school of Twelver Shi'ism, which attracted followers from throughout the Persian and Ottoman Empires.

He was a native of the Al-Ahsa region of eastern Arabia (modern-day Al Hofuf), educated in Bahrain and the theological centres of Najaf and Karbala. He spent 16 years in Iran, where he received the protection and patronage of princes of the Qajar dynasty.

Shaykh Ahmad diverged from the Usuli school on key issues related to Islamic eschatology, the role of the ulama, and the proper interpretation of the mystical hadith of the Twelve Imams. He claimed to derive parts of his jurisprudence from the Imam al-Zaman, who communicated with him through signs in day-to-day life, and the other Twelve Imams, whom he claimed guidance from in dreams, visions, and other mystical states, that he also claimed to teach students how to induce. These divergences resulted in accusations of heresy from orthodox members of the Usuli Shia ulama, and instances of persecution against al-Ahsa'i and his followers occurred during and after his lifetime. His teachings were complex, thus he often practised Taqiyyah concealing his controversial ideas from his opponents.

Al-Ahsa'i's chief disciple was Sayyid Kazim Rashti, who succeeded him as the leader of the school. Rashti, who also claimed to be guided by mystical states, consolidated the disparate Shaykhi followers, but did not appoint a successor himself. Shaykhism then became split between a conservative faction led by Karim Khan Kermani (whose school was then divided into Ihqaqi and Awhadi schools), and an alternate interpretation by Ali-Muhammad, better known as the Bāb, who claimed to be a new prophet to abrogate Islam. Many Shaykhis became Bābīs, most of whom later became Bahā'īs, who now number in the millions and consider the visions of al-Ahsa'i to be the first stirrings of their religion.

== Background ==
=== Early life ===
Al-Ahsa'i was born Ahmad bin Zayn al-Dín bin Ibráhím. Little is documented about his early life. He was born in the al-Ahsa Oasis in the month of Rajab of the year 1166 AH (3 May — 1 June, 1753 CE). His family came from nomadic Sunni ancestry in the Banī Khālid tribe, but had converted to Shi'ism and settled in al-Ahsa five generations earlier. Al-Ahsa was also home to the influential 15th century Shia Muslim scholar Ibn Abi Jumhur al-Ahsa'i, the remnants of whose library would have been available to Shaykh Ahmad and may have assisted with his theological upbringing.

Nabíl's Narrative, chronicling early Babi and Baháʼí history and the influence of Shaykhi thought in that milieu, describes a contemporaneous understanding of Al-Ahsa'i's motives and his spiritual awakening as follows:

He observed how those who professed the Faith of Islam had shattered its unity, sapped its force, perverted its purpose, and degraded its holy name. His soul was filled with anguish at the sight of the corruption and strife which characterised the Shí'ah sect of Islam [...] Forsaking his home and kindred, on one of the islands of Bahrayn, to the south of the Persian Gulf, he set out, [...] to unravel the mysteries of those verses of Islamic Scriptures which foreshadowed the advent of a new Manifestation [...] There burned in his soul the conviction that no reform, however drastic, within the Faith of Islam, could achieve the regeneration of this perverse people. He knew, [...] that nothing short of a new and independent Revelation, as attested and foreshadowed by the sacred Scriptures of Islam, could revive the fortunes and restore the purity of that decadent Faith.

— Nabíl-i-Aʻzam, The Dawn-Breakers

=== Education and mission ===
Shaykh Ahmad, at about age forty (1784 or 1794 - circa), began to study in earnest in the Shiʻi centres of religious scholarship such as Karbala and Najaf. He attained sufficient recognition in such circles to be declared a mujtahid in Karbala, an interpreter of Islamic law. He contended with Sufi and Neo-Platonist scholars, and attained a positive reputation among their detractors. He declared that all knowledge and sciences were contained (in essential form) within the Quran, and that to excel in the sciences, all knowledge must be gleaned from the Quran. To this end he developed systems of interpretation of the Quran and sought to inform himself of all the sciences current in the Muslim world.

He also evinced a veneration of the imams, even beyond the extent of his pious contemporaries and espoused heterodox views on the afterlife, the resurrection and end-times, as well as medicine and cosmology. His views on the soul posited a "subtle body" separate from, and associated with the physical body, and this also altered his views on the occultation of the Imam Muhammad al-Mahdi. His views resulted in his denunciation by several learned clerics, and he engaged in many debates before moving on to Persia where he settled for a time in the province of Yazd. It was in Yazd that much of his books and letters were written.

== Visions ==
He experienced a series of dreams and visions. In one such dream recounted by him, he believed that he was granted permission to transmit knowledge by each of the twelve Imams. In another dream he saw Imam Hasan teaching him Quranic verses.

=== Thought ===
The theology of al-Ahsa'i is deeply influenced by that of Shihab al-Din Yahya ibn Habash Suhrawardi. Notably on the ethereal existence of the Hidden Imam in the unseen realm, the means by which one could recognize him, and the timing and circumstances surrounding his anticipated advent. Ahsa'i's quest for salvation for humanity transcended mere religious obligations, focusing instead on an intuitive engagement with the sacred within a conceptual space he termed "horqalya." This realm, borrowed from the twelfth-century Iranian philosopher Shihab al-Din Yahya ibn Habash Suhrawardi, served as an intermediary zone between earthly existence and the celestial domain.

Within the imaginative landscape of “horqalya”, the Hidden Imam remained invisible to humanity, much like the souls of believers awaiting the Day of Resurrection. In this realm, believers who honed their intellectual and moral capacities could contemplate the presence of the Imam of the Age and encounter his "manifestation" in the corporeal world. Ahsa'i identified the "Perfect Shi‘a" as one who attained this state of visionary perfection, capable of guiding others along a similar transformative journey. This concept echoed the well-established idea of the "Perfect Man" (ensan-e kamel) found in speculative Sufism.

Ahsa'i offered a resolution to the perplexing question of the Hidden Imam's thousand-year longevity in a non-physical state by proposing the existence of his celestial prototype in the “horqalya” sphere. While Ahsa'i never explicitly articulated this in his often cryptic works, the implication emerged that the Hidden Imam would eventually manifest himself in a new earthly form at the culmination of time.

== Founding the Shaykhi school ==
Juan Cole summarises the situation at the advent of the Shaykhi School, and the questions that were unfolding as his views crystallised and he acquired an early following:

When Shaykh Ahmad al-Ahsa'i wrote, there was no Shaykhi school, which only crystallized after his death. He saw himself as a mainstream Shiʻite, not as a sectarian leader. Yet he clearly innovated in Shiʻi thought in ways that, toward the end of his life, sparked great controversy. Among the contentious arenas he entered was that of the nature of religious authority. He lived at a time when his branch of Islam was deeply divided on the role of the Muslim learned man. Was he an exemplar to be emulated by the laity without fail, or merely the first among equals, bound by a literal interpretation of the sacred text just as was everyone else? Or was he, as the Sufis maintained, a pole channeling the grace of God to those less enlightened than himself? How may we situate Shaykh Ahmad al-Ahsa'i with regard to these contending visions of Shiʻi Islam?

Moojan Momen in his Introduction to Shiʻi Islam (George Ronald, Oxford, 1985) states that many mujtahids were afraid that the Shaykh's preference for intuitive knowledge, which he claimed to obtain directly by inspiration from the Imams, would seriously undermine the authority of their position. Momen has commented on Shaykh Ahmad's doctrines and his succession during which the conflict with Shiʻi orthodoxy intensified.

Nader Saiedi in his Gate of the Heart (Wilfrid Laurier University Press, 2010) characterised the Shaykhis of the early-to-mid 19th century by their fervent millenarian expectations, their complex mystical and esoteric knowledge, their insistence on the absolute transcendence of the divine Essence, their rejection of the doctrine of wahdatu’l-wujúd, their reinterpretation of the traditional doctrine of bodily resurrection, and their ambiguous assertions concerning the necessity of the presence of a living Gate (a Báb) to the Hidden Imám for the guidance of the Shí'i community.

== Successor ==
Shaykh Ahmad appointed Kazim Rashti as his successor, who led the Shaykhí movement until his death. He taught his students how to recognize the Mahdi and the Masih (the returned Jesus). After his death in 1843, many of his students spread out around Iraq and Iran to search for a new leader.

== Works ==
Shaykh Ahmad was a prolific writer, he is known to have completed 71 published works during his career, of which 354 contemporary manuscripts are known to be still extant. Writing primarily in Arabic, his work spanned a wide array of literary forms. The largest number of his works consist of correspondence with other members of the ulama or his students, usually intended to expand upon a teaching advanced in another work, or provide answers to vexing questions of theology or jurisprudence. Treatises and lessons composed independently by al-Ahsáʼí make up a smaller number of his works, but tend to be longer than his correspondence and more commonly studied and reprinted. In keeping with Islamic and Persian literary and academic tradition, a large number of his works take the form of commentaries on Surahs from the Qurʼan, important Hadiths of Muhammad or the Imams, or writing by earlier mystical or theological writers. The most comprehensive bibliography of Ahmad's known works identifies twelve wide subject areas addressed by individual works:

• Sharh al-Hikma al-Arshiyya - a multi-volume commentary on the al-Hikma al-Arshiyya of MuIla Sadra (Tabriz, 1854)

• Sharh al-Fawa'id. Lithographed. N.P. (Tabriz: 1856).

• Jawami' al-Kalim. Lithographed. N.P. (Tabriz: 1856-59).

• Sharh al-Masha'ir. Lithographed. N.P. (Tehran: 1861).

• Sharh al-'Arshiyya. Lithographed. N.P. (Tehran: 1861).

• Sharh al-Ziyara al-Jami'a al-Kabira. Chapkhaneh Sa'adat (Kirman: 1972), 4 Volumes.

• Rasa'il al-Hikma. Al-Da'ira al-'Alamiyya (Beirut: 1993).
