= Shaykhism =

Followers of Shaykh Ahmad

Shaykhism (Arabic: الشيخية, romanized: al-Shaykhiyya), also known as Ihqaqism, Awhadism or Kirmanism, is a term used by Shia Muslims for the followers of Shaykh Ahmad in early 19th-century Qajar Iran and the Khalid Emirate. While grounded in traditional Twelver Shiʻi doctrine, Shaykh Ahmad's ideas diverged from the Usuli school in the source of jurisprudential authority, and the hermeneutic to be employed in interpreting prophecy and the writings of the Twelver Imams, believing in the mystical Marjaiyyah of a uniform Shaykh, who provides for epistemology via hierophantic knowledge derived from deep study of "high ma'arifah." These divergences resulted in controversy and ongoing accusations of heresy from Usulis and Akhbaris.

It has been described as a mystical strand of Twelver Shi'a Islam. As of 2001, there remained a following in Iran, Iraq, Saudi Arabia, Kuwait and Pakistan.

== Shaykhi teachings ==
=== Eschatology ===
The primary force behind Ahmad's teachings is the belief in the occultation of the Twelfth Imam. Believers in this doctrine, hold that the last divine ordained leader, or Imam, lives in occultation and will reappear as the promised Mahdi. Following the Mahdi's appearance, Ahmad teaches that the Imam Hussain ibn Ali will return to re-conquer the world and that Ali and Muhammad will kill Satan then Hussain will rule over the World for 50,000 years. Al Raj'a (meaning "the return" in English) was heavily emphasized by Ahmad and is more important in Shaykhism than in the Usuli school of Islam.

Shaykh Ahmad's perspectives on accepted Islamic doctrines diverged in several areas, most notably on his mystical interpretation of prophesy. The sun, moon and stars of the Qurʼan's eschatological surahs are seen as allegorical, similar to Ismaili doctrine, where common Muslim interpretation is that events involving celestial bodies will happen literally at the Day of Judgment.

==== Hurqalya ====
In an effort to "harmonize reason and religion" and "explain some doctrines of Islam that appear contrary to reason" and the laws of the natural world, Shaykh Ahmad, postulated an intermediary world between the physical and spiritual worlds that he called hurqalya. Everything in the physical world would have counterparts in hurqalya, and events and concepts of Islamic doctrine that did not make sense in the physical world -- heaven, hell, resurrection from the dead, Muhammad's Isra' and Mi'raj, the long life of the Twelfth Imam and the two cities "he is supposed to live" in, Jabulqa and Jabulsa -- all would exist in the realm of hurqalya. Consequently, everyone would have two bodies, one in the natural world and one in hurqalya. Shaykhism teaches that Zuhūr and Raj'a are both in Hurqalya then comes the World of Qiyamah which is mixture between the Physical World and Hurqalya. It was this concept of hurqalya, "more than anything else" that led to Shaykh Ahmad's conflict with the ulama.

=== Mystical interpretation ===
In other writings, Shaykh Ahmad synthesizes rather dramatic descriptions of the origin of the prophets, the primal word, and other religious themes through allusions and mystical language. Much of this language is oriented around trees, specifically the primal universal tree of Eden, described in Jewish scripture as being two trees. This primal tree is, in some ways, the universal spirit of the prophets themselves:

The symbol of the preexistent tree appears elsewhere in Shaykh Ahmad's writings. He says, for instance, that Muhammad and the Imams exist both on the level of unconstrained being or preexistence, wherein they are the Complete Word and the Most Perfect Man, and on the level of constrained being. On this second, limited plane, the cloud of the divine Will subsists and from it emanates the Primal Water that irrigates the barren earth of matter and of elements. Although the divine Will remains unconstrained in essential being, its manifest aspect has now entered into limited being. When God poured down from the clouds of Will on the barren earth, he thereby sent down this water and it mixed with the fallow soil. In the garden of the heaven known as as-Saqurah, the Tree of Eternity arose, and the Holy Spirit or Universal Intellect, the first branch that grew upon it, is the first creation among the worlds.

== Prominent Scholars ==
=== Shaykh Ahmad ===
Shaykh Ahmad, at about age forty, began to study in earnest in the Shiʻa centres of religious scholarship such as Karbala and Najaf. He attained sufficient recognition in such circles to be declared a mujtahid, an interpreter of Islamic Law. He contended with Sufi and Neo-Platonist scholars, and attained a positive reputation among their detractors. He declared that all knowledge and sciences were contained (in essential form) within the Qurʼan, and that to excel in the sciences, all knowledge must be gleaned from the Qurʼan. His leadership style and approach to interpretation draw both on traditional and theosophical methods, attempting to harmonize these two streams of Shiʻia thought in unprecedented ways, and emphasizing the validity of intuitive knowledge for religious thought. Rather than relying entirely on Ijtihad, or independent rational justification, Shakyh Ahmad claimed to derive direct guidance from the Imams. Relying entirely on individual justification for religious guidance had, he suggested, led to the introduction into Shiʻa belief of erroneous views of particular scholars. By emphasizing the role of a charismatic leader whose work was suggested to share in the infallibility of the Imams, Shakyh Ahmad suggested that the diversity of rulings promoted by the ulama could be replaced with a singular set of doctrines-this view would later find widespread support in the Ayatollah system of modern Usulism. His views resulted in his denunciation by several learned clerics, and he engaged in many debates before moving on to Persia where he settled for a time in the province of Yazd. It was in Isfahan that most of this was written.

=== Sayyid Kazim Rashti ===
Al-Ahsa'is most prominent student, Kazim Rashti, was given the authority to teach on his behalf in Karbala and became his undisputed successor.

Abbas Amanat notes that, in contrast to other religious schools in Iran where students came from families of high-ranking clerics, "the majority of the students in Rashti's circle, with the exception of a few, were alike in their humble origins".

=== Karim Khan ===
Al-Rashti had hundreds of students and several of his leading students claimed to be the true successors to his scholarship. The two main currents of Shaykhism since then came to be known as the Kermani and Tabrizi Schools.

Karim Khan Kermani (1809/1810-1870/1871) became the leader of the main Shaykhi group. He became the foremost critic of those that formed a new religion, writing four essays against them. He repudiated some of the more radical teachings of Ahsai and Rashti and moved the Shaykhi school back towards the mainstream Usuli teachings. Karim Khan Kirmani was succeeded by his son Shaykh Muhammad Khan Kirmani (1846–1906), then by Muhammad's brother Shaykh Zaynal 'Abidln Kirmani (1859–1946). Shaykh Zayn al-'Abidin Kirmani was succeeded by Shaykh Abu al-Qasim Ibrahimi (1896–1969), who was succeeded by his son 'Abd al-Reza Khan Ebrahimi who was a leader until his death.

== Later Shaykhism ==
The late Ali al-Musawi was the leader of a community with followers in Iraq - mainly Basrah and Karbala - Iran and the Persian Gulf. Basrah has a significant Shaykhi minority, and their mosque is one of the largest in the city holding up to 12,000 people. The Shaykhiya were resolutely apolitical and hence were allowed relative freedom under Saddam Hussein. Since the 2003 Invasion of Iraq and subsequent Iraqi Civil War they have been targeted by Iraqi nationalists who accused them of being Saudis on the grounds that Ahmad al-Ahsai was from present-day Saudi Arabia. They responded by creating an armed militia and asking all local political groups to sign a pact allowing them to live in peace. This was done at the al-Zahra conference in April 2006. In a move away from their traditional apolitical stance, a Shaykhi political party stood in the Basra governorate election, 2009; they came third, winning 5% of the votes and 2 out of 35 seats.

Shaykhi amongst Shia Islam

== Reception in other religions ==
The Shaykhi movement, particularly through the teachings of Shaykh Ahmad al-Ahsai and his successor Sayyed Kazim Rashti, contained prophecies regarding the advent of the Qa'im—the promised 12th Imam. Shaykh Ahmad and Sayyed Kazim emphasized the imminent fulfillment of the prophecy of the return of the Hidden Imam circa 1844 - a full thousand years following the occultation of the Hidden Imam - setting an expectation among their followers that the fulfillment of these prophecies was near. Sayyed Kazim, before his death, even instructed his followers to actively search for the Qa'im, indicating a sense of urgency and belief that the promised figure would appear in their lifetime, potentially around the year 1844.

The Shayki prophecy originates from Shaykh Ahmad al-Ahsai, who himself reported to have spiritually received the revelation from the 12th Imam directly. According to the Shaykh Ahmad al-Ahsai, the advent of the imminent arrival of the Mahdi, the "hidden Imam," was not only near, but immanent - so much so that they urged their followers to prepare spiritually for his advent. This belief in the imminent manifestation of the Mahdi and the fulfillment of Shaykhi-Shia prophecy set the stage for the later emergence of the Bábí and Bahá'í movements, which emerged in precise coincidence with the prophecies of Skaykh Admad al-Ahsai to claim fulfillment of these eschatological expectations, with Sayyid `Ali Muhammad Shirazi declaring himself the Báb (meaning "Gate") in 1844, initiating the Bábí Faith that evolved into the Bahá'í Faith.

The Shaykhi emphasis on the esoteric aspects of Shi'a Islam and their specific interpretation of the Mahdi’s role makes this prophecy a key component of the mystical and apocalyptic currents within Shi'a thought. The Shaykhi leaders were instrumental in fostering a climate of anticipation that was receptive to claims of divine revelation during a turbulent period of religious fervor in Iran.

The specific argument for 1844 as the prophesied year emerges from the millenarian expectations of the Shaykhis, which were shaped by various esoteric and mystical calculations based on Islamic traditions. Sayyed Kazim's teachings often alluded to a particular timeline, indicating that significant events would coincide with the completion of the first millennium of the Hijri calendar and the beginning of the 13th century AH, which aligns roughly with the year 1844 in the Gregorian calendar. The Shaykhis believed that they were on the brink of witnessing a transformative spiritual era, and many of them viewed the events of 1844—particularly the declaration of the Báb—as the fulfillment of these prophecies.

After the Báb's declaration in 1844, many Shaykhis became convinced that he was the intermediary, if not the Qa'im himself, as they had been anticipating a divine figure who would restore and reform the spiritual state of the world. This expectation and the subsequent recognition of the Báb as the fulfillment of the prophecies were significant reasons why a large portion of the Shaykhi community transitioned to become Bábís, the number of whom ranged from around 100,000 to 200,000 adherents, and were subject to fierce persecutions culminating in intense conflicts with the Persian authorities during the mid-19th century, leading to massacres which severely reduced the number of adherents.

Bábís and then Baháʼís see Shaykhism as a spiritual ancestor of their movement, preparing the way for the Báb and eventually Baháʼu'lláh. According to this view, Shaykhism has outlived its eschatological purpose and is no longer relevant. There are many connections between Bábism and Shaykhism. The Báb met with Siyyid Kazim several times and more than half of the 'prominent' converts to the Bábí Faith in its first four years were Shaykhis according to Moojan Momen and Peter Smith. One key similarity between Shaykhism and the Bábí and Baháʼí Faiths is their shared emphasis on a symbolic and allegorical understanding of religious scripture.
