= Histoire Naturelle =

1749–1804 encyclopedic collection by Buffon

Histoire Naturelle, générale et particulière, avec la description du Cabinet du Roi
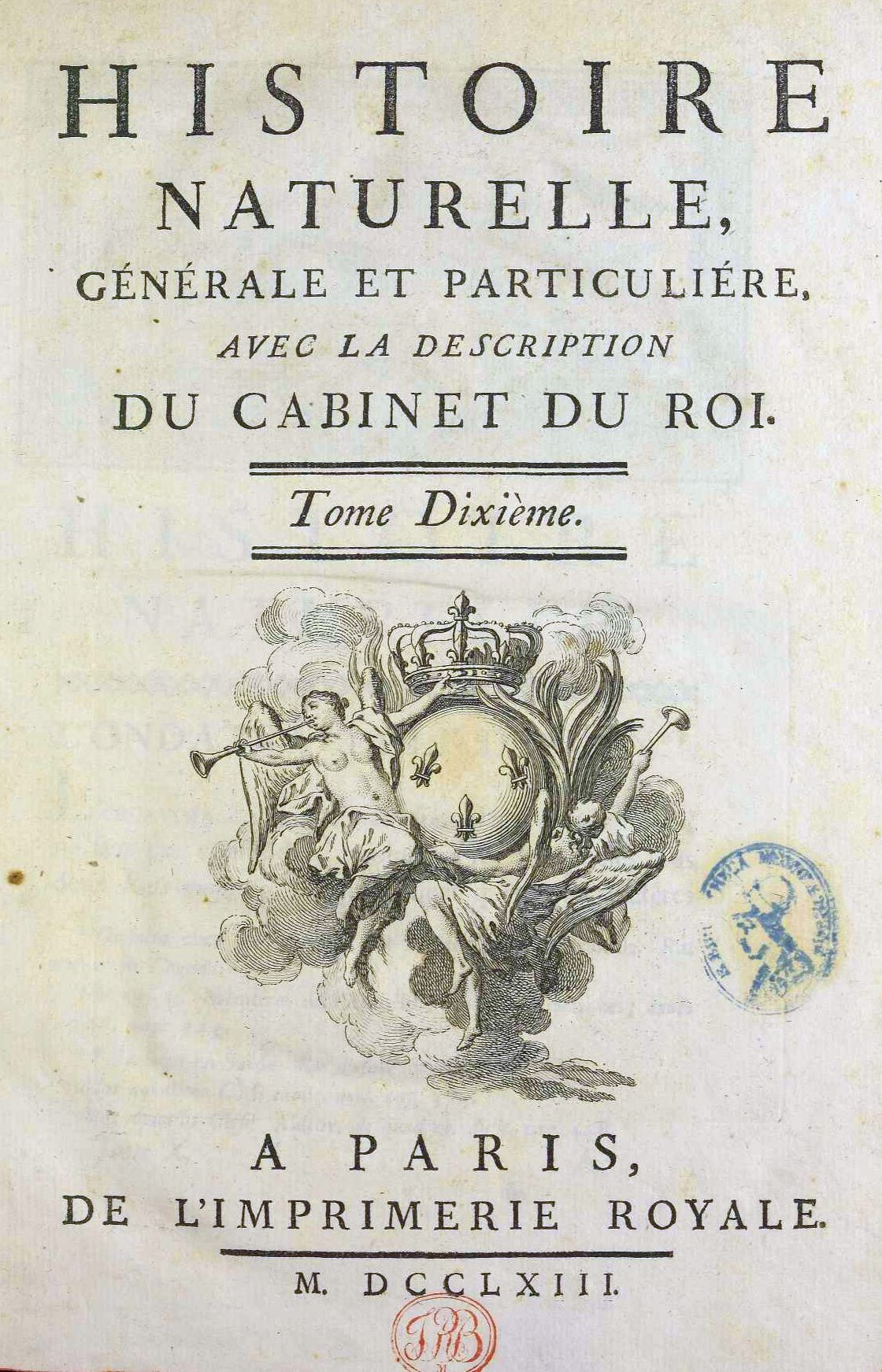
- Title page of the 10th volume, 1763
- Author: Georges-Louis Leclerc, comte de Buffon
- Illustrator: Jacques de Sève and others
- Subject: Natural history, minerals, quadrupeds, birds
- Genre: Encyclopaedia
- Publisher: Imprimerie royale
- Publication date: 1749–1804
- Publication place: France
- Pages: 36 + 8 volumes

The Histoire Naturelle, générale et particulière, avec la description du Cabinet du Roi (French: [istwaʁ natyʁɛl]; English: Natural History, General and Particular, with a Description of the King's Cabinet) is an encyclopaedic collection of 36 large (quarto) volumes written between 1749 and 1804, initially by the Comte de Buffon, and continued in eight more volumes after his death (in 1788) by his colleagues, led by Bernard Germain de Lacépède. The books cover what was known of the "natural sciences" at the time, including what would now be called material science, physics, chemistry and technology as well as the natural history of animals.

The early volumes (IV to XV) are on quadrupeds. The next group (XVI to XXIV) are on birds, followed by a group on minerals (XXV to XXIX). There followed a group of supplements on geology and related subjects, with additional quadrupeds (XXX to XXXVI). Further supplements covered the reptiles (XXXVII to XXXVIII) and fishes (XXXIX to XXXXIII). Finally there was a volume on cetaceans (XXXXIV). The work was republished in various editions in France, and was translated into languages including English, German, Swedish, Italian, and Russian.

Buffon was assisted over the years by a variety of authors with different expertise, including Philippe Guéneau de Montbeillard on birds. The principal illustrator was Jacques de Sève, who prepared some 2000 plates for the encyclopedia, while additional plates on birds were made by François-Nicolas Martinet.

The Histoire Naturelle was welcomed by its wealthy readership: the first edition sold out within six weeks. However, it attracted criticism from some priests for its assertion that the Earth was over 6,000 years old, contradicting the biblical account.

From the 21st-century perspective of the Stanford Encyclopedia of Philosophy, the work has been seen as introducing "a secular and realist account of the origins of the earth and its life forms", contrary to the tradition of Descartes. Others such as the botanist Sandra Knapp have commented on Buffon's purple prose, which tended to obscure any ideas in the text. The evolutionary biologist Ernst Mayr called Buffon "the father of all thought in natural history" at his time, setting the scene for evolutionists to address the issues he raised.

== An encyclopaedic work ==
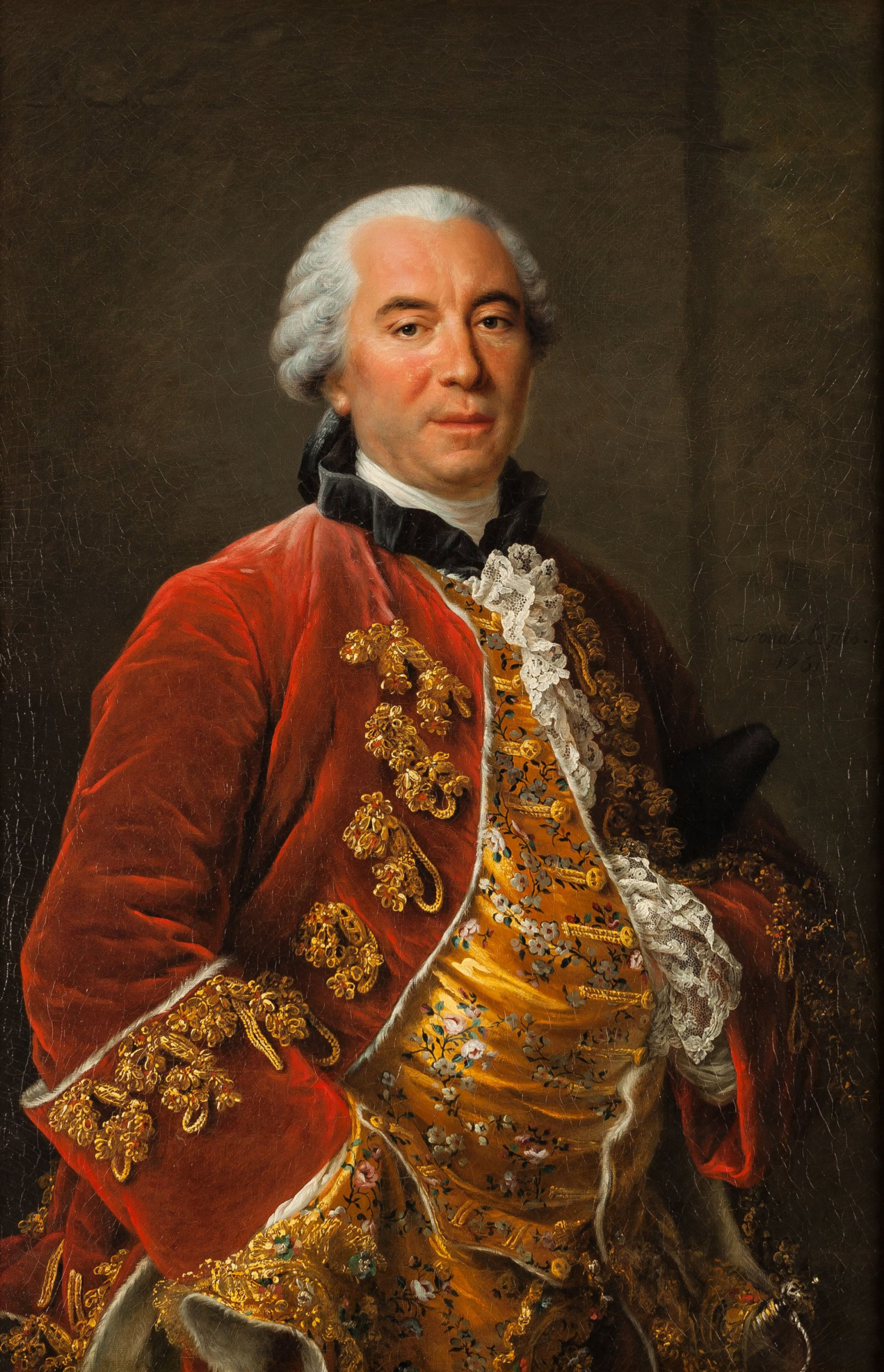
The Comte de Buffon (1707–1788) made the Histoire Naturelle his life's work.

The Histoire Naturelle, générale et particulière, avec la description du Cabinet du Roi is the work that the Comte de Buffon (1707–1788) is remembered for. He worked on it for some 50 years, initially at Montbard in his office in the Tour Saint-Louis, then in his library at Petit Fontenet. 36 volumes came out between 1749 and 1789, followed by 8 more after his death, thanks to Bernard Germain de Lacépède. It includes all the knowledge available in his time on the "natural sciences", a broad term that includes disciplines which today would be called material science, physics, chemistry and technology. Buffon notes the morphological similarities between men and apes, although he considered apes completely devoid of the ability to think, differentiating them sharply from human beings. Buffon's attention to internal anatomy made him an early comparative anatomist. "L’intérieur, dans les êtres vivants, est le fond du dessin de la nature", he wrote in his Quadrupèdes, "the interior, in living things, is the foundation of nature's design."

L’Histoire Naturelle met immense success, almost as great as Encyclopédie by Diderot, which came out in the same period. The first three volumes of L’Histoire Naturelle, générale et particulière, avec la description du cabinet du Roi were reprinted three times in six weeks.

== Contents by volume ==
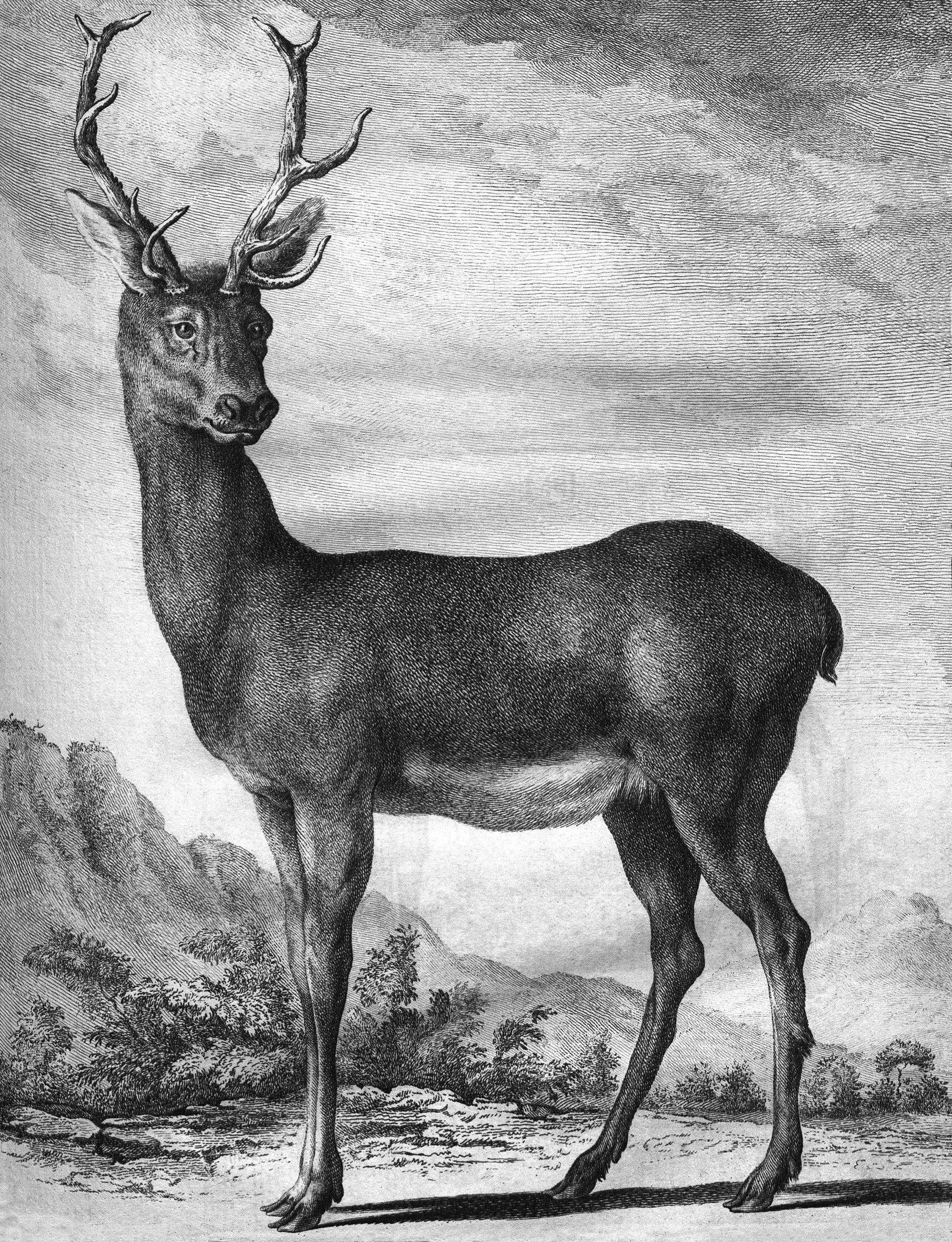
Stag from Quadrupèdes

The original edition was arranged as follows:

Natural history, and description of the king's cabinet of curiosities

- Volume I : Premier Discours - De la manière d’étudier et de traiter l’histoire naturelle, Second Discours - Histoire et théorie de la Terre, Preuves de la théorie de la Terre, 1749
- Volume II : Histoire générale des Animaux, Histoire Naturelle de l'Homme, 1749
- Volume III : Description du cabinet du Roi, Histoire Naturelle de l'Homme, 1749

Quadrupèdes (Quadrupeds)

- Volume IV (Quadrupèdes I) : Discours sur la nature des Animaux, Les Animaux domestiques, 1753
- Volume V (Quadrupèdes II) : 1755
- Volume VI (Quadrupèdes III) : Les Animaux sauvages, 1756
- Volume VII (Quadrupèdes IV) : Les Animaux carnassiers, 1758
- Volume VIII (Quadrupèdes V) : 1760
- Volume IX (Quadrupèdes VI) : 1761
- Volume X (Quadrupèdes VII) : 1763
- Volume XI (Quadrupèdes VIII) : 1764
- Volume XII (Quadrupèdes IX) : 1764
- Volume XIII (Quadrupèdes X) : 1765
- Volume XIV (Quadrupèdes XI) : Nomenclature des Singes, De la dégénération des Animaux, 1766
- Volume XV (Quadrupèdes XII) : 1767

Histoire Naturelle des Oiseaux (Birds) (1770–1783)

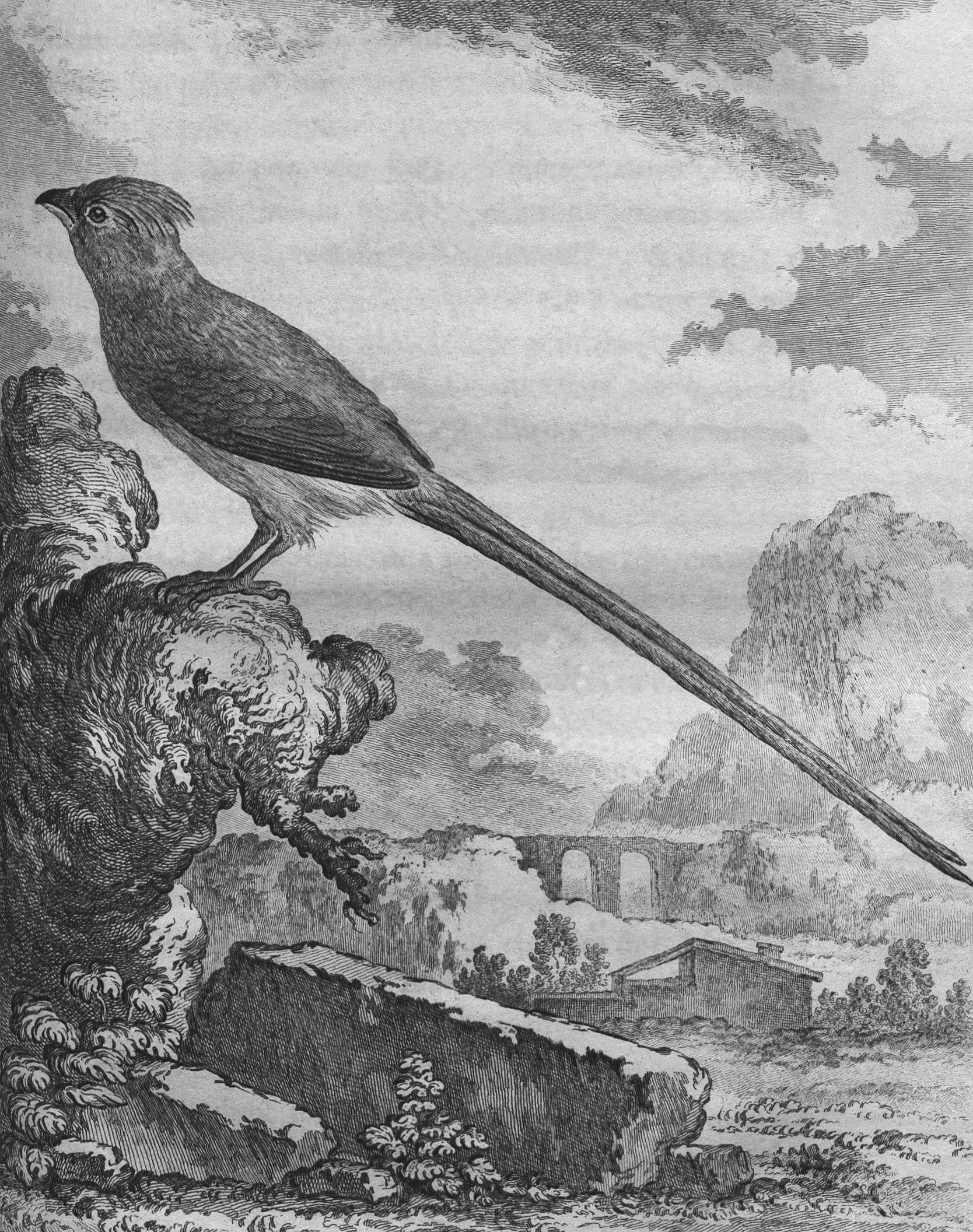
Blue-naped mousebird

- Volume XVI (Oiseaux I) : 1770
- Volume XVII (Oiseaux II) : 1771
- Volume XVIII (Oiseaux III) : 1774
- Volume XIX (Oiseaux IV) : 1778
- Volume XX (Oiseaux V) : 1778
- Volume XXI (Oiseaux VI) : 1779
- Volume XXII (Oiseaux VII) : 1780
- Volume XXIII (Oiseaux VIII) : 1781
- Volume XXIV (Oiseaux IX) : 1783

Histoire Naturelle des Minéraux (Minerals) (1783–1788)

- Volume XXV (Minéraux I) : 1783
- Volume XXVI (Minéraux II) : 1783
- Volume XXVII (Minéraux III) : 1785
- Volume XXVIII (Minéraux IV) : 1786
- Volume XXIX (Minéraux V) : Traité de l'Aimant et de ses usages, 1788

Suppléments à l’Histoire Naturelle, générale et particulière (Supplements) (1774–1789)

- Volume XXX (Suppléments I) : Servant de suite à la Théorie de la Terre, et d’introduction à l’Histoire des Minéraux, 1774
- Volume XXXI (Suppléments II) : Servant de suite à la Théorie de la Terre, et de préliminaire à l’Histoire des Végétaux - Parties Expérimentale & Hypothétique, 1775
- Volume XXXII (Suppléments III) : Servant de suite à l'Histoire des Animaux quadrupèdes, 1776
- Volume XXXIII (Suppléments IV) : Servant de suite à l'Histoire Naturelle de l'Homme, 1777
- Volume XXXIV (Suppléments V) : Des Époques de la nature, 1779
- Volume XXXV (Suppléments VI) : Servant de suite à l'Histoire des Animaux quadrupèdes, 1782
- Volume XXXVI (Suppléments VII) : Servant de suite à l'Histoire des Animaux quadrupèdes, 1789

Histoire Naturelle des Quadrupèdes ovipares et des Serpents (Egg-laying Quadrupeds and Snakes) (1788–1789)

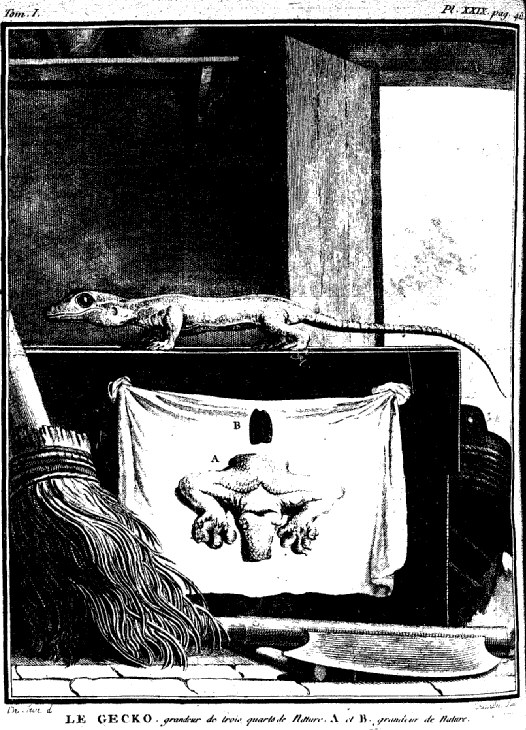
The Gecko, 1788

- Volume XXXVII (Reptiles I) : Histoire générale et particulière des Quadrupèdes ovipares, 1788
- Volume XXXVIII (Reptiles II) : Histoire des Serpents, 1789

Histoire Naturelle des Poissons (Fish) (1798–1803)

- Volume XXXIX (Poissons I) : 1798
- Volume XXXX (Poissons II) : 1800
- Volume XXXXI (Poissons III) : 1802
- Volume XXXXII (Poissons IV) : 1802
- Volume XXXXIII (Poissons V) : 1803

Histoire Naturelle des Cétacés (Cetaceans) (1804)

- Volume XXXXIV (Cétacés) : 1804

== Authors and artists ==
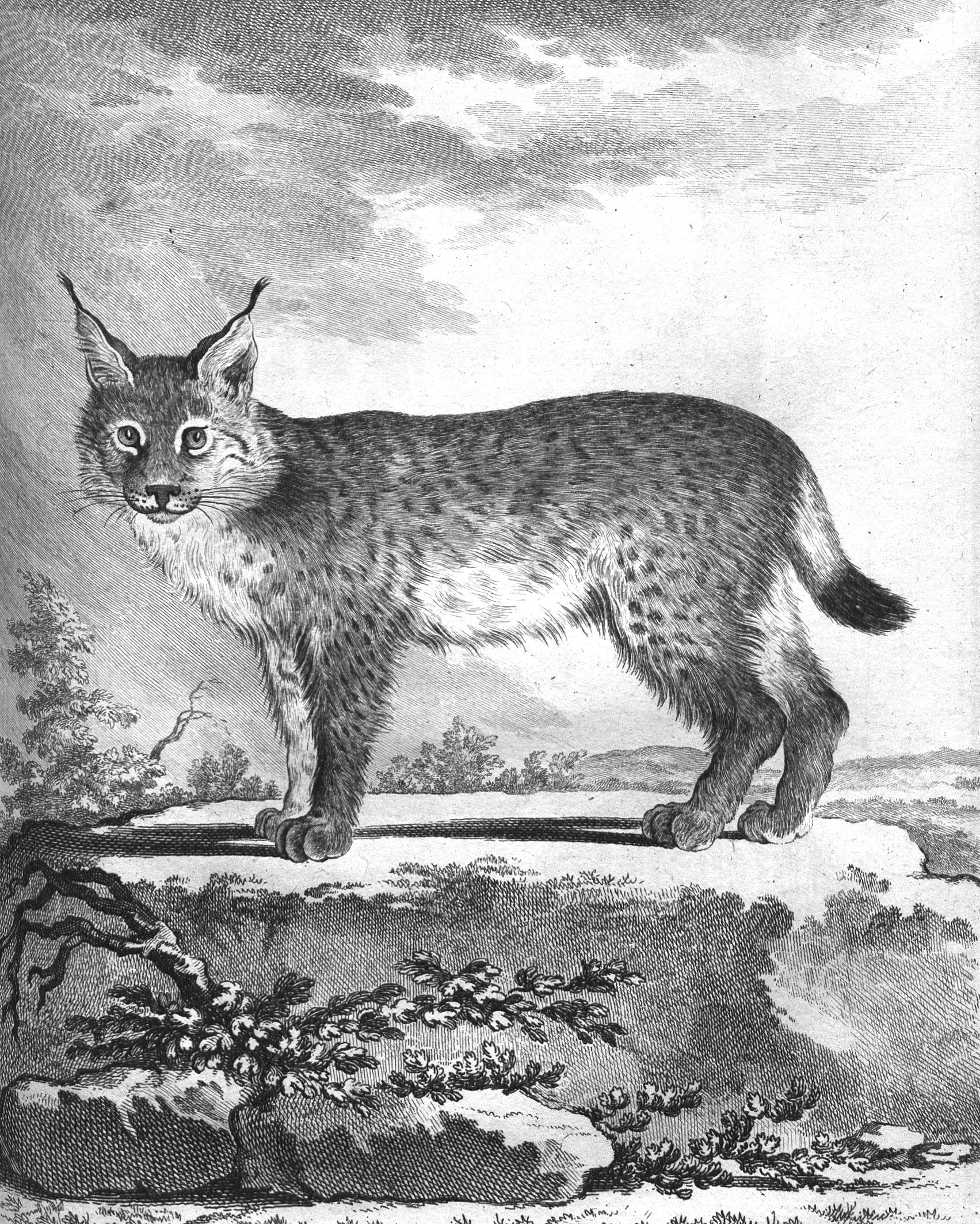
Lynx in Volume IX, by Jacques de Sève

The descriptive and anatomical part of l’Histoire des Quadrupèdes was the work of Louis Jean-Marie Daubenton. Philippe Guéneau de Montbeillard worked on the birds, assisted later by Barthélemy Faujas de Saint-Fond and the abbot Gabriel Bexon. Barthélemy Faujas de Saint-Fond and Louis Bernard Guyton de Morveau provided sources for the mineral volumes.

Buffon commissioned Jacques de Sève to illustrate the quadrupeds, while François-Nicolas Martinet illustrated the birds. Some 2000 plates by de Sève adorn the work, representing mammals, reptiles, and some birds.

After Buffon's death, the work was continued by Bernard Germain de Lacépède, who described the egg-laying quadrupeds, snakes, fishes and cetaceans in 8 volumes (1788–1804).

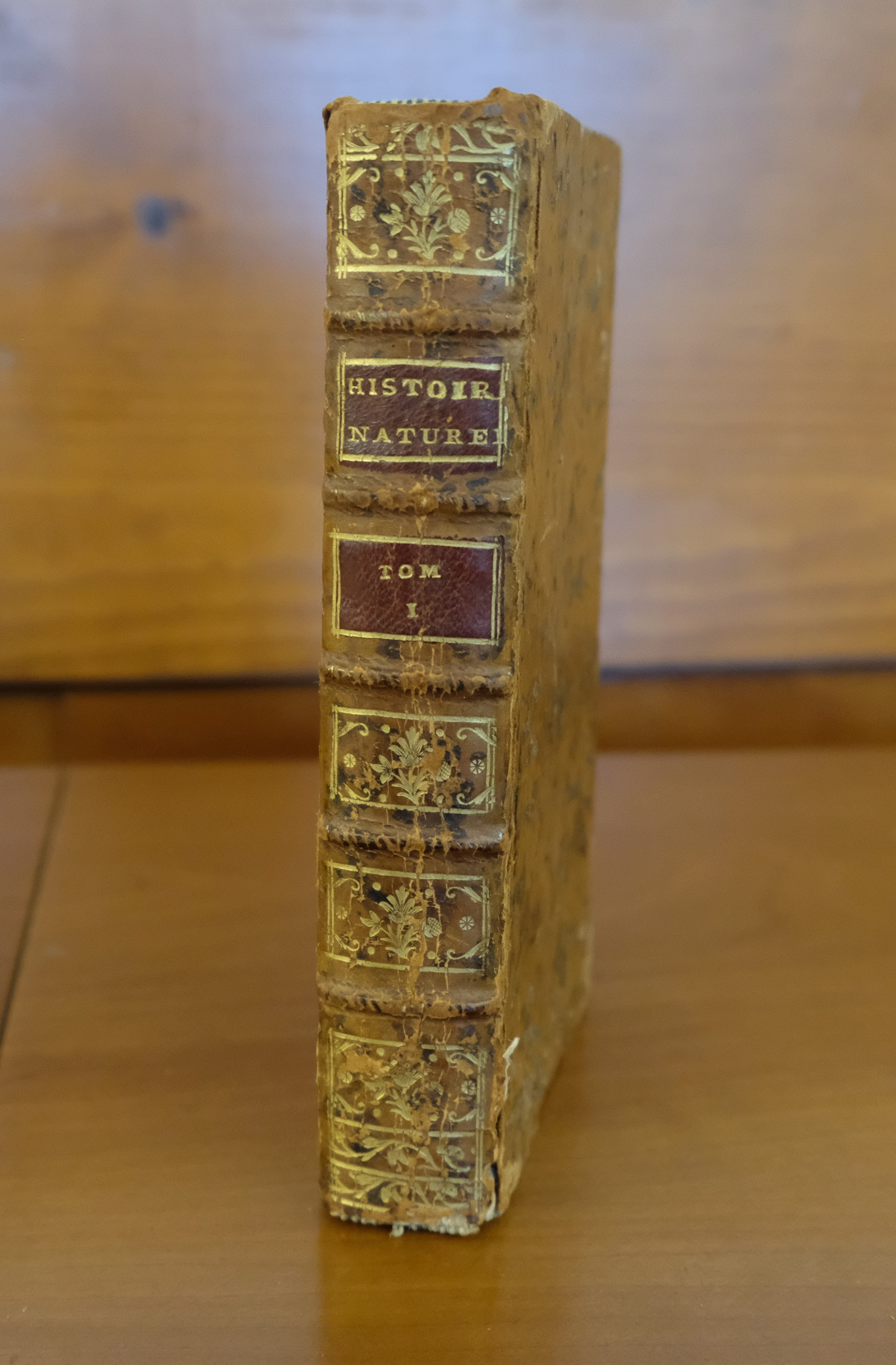
1774 edition of volume 1

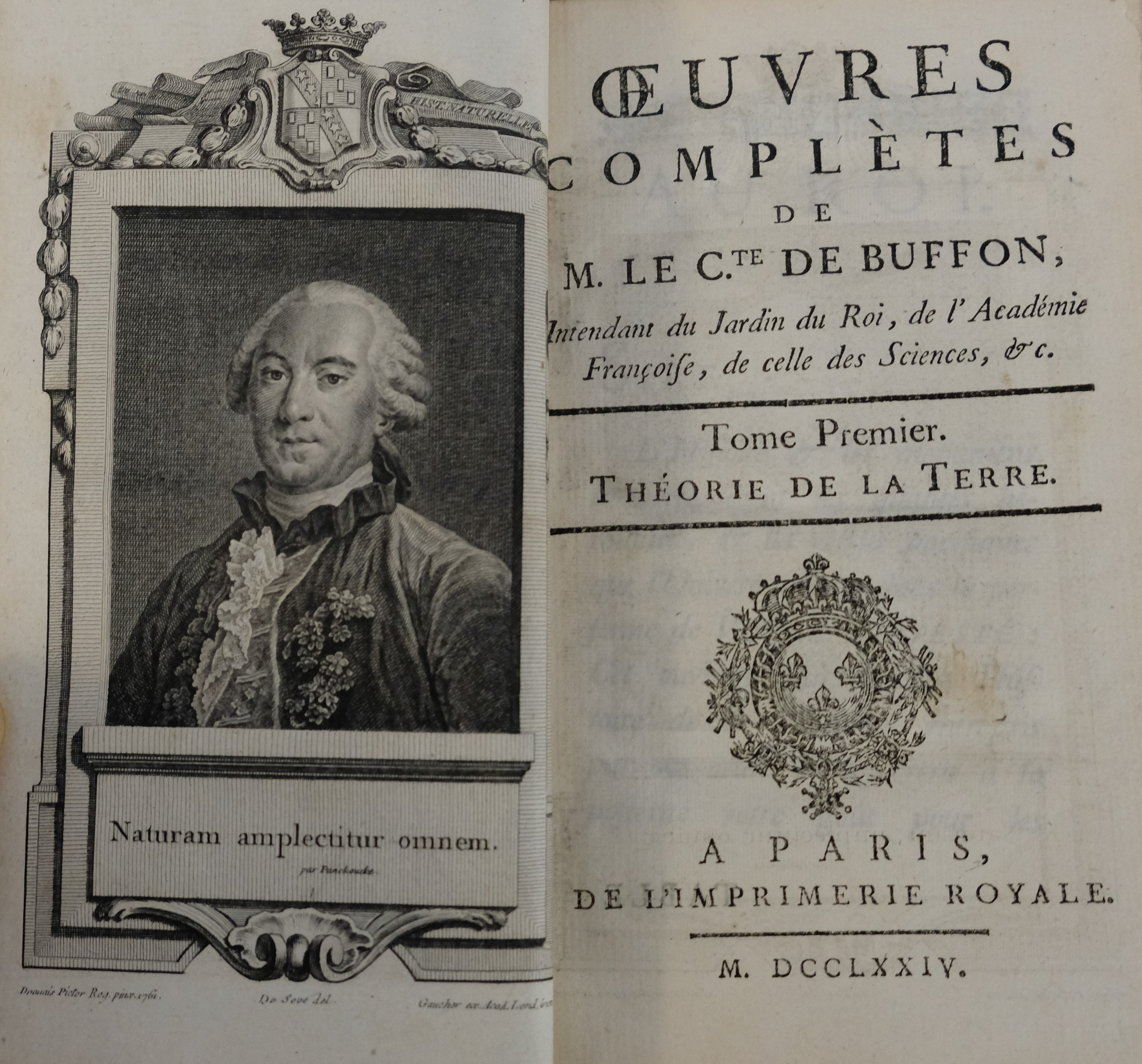
Frontispiece of 1774 edition of volume 1

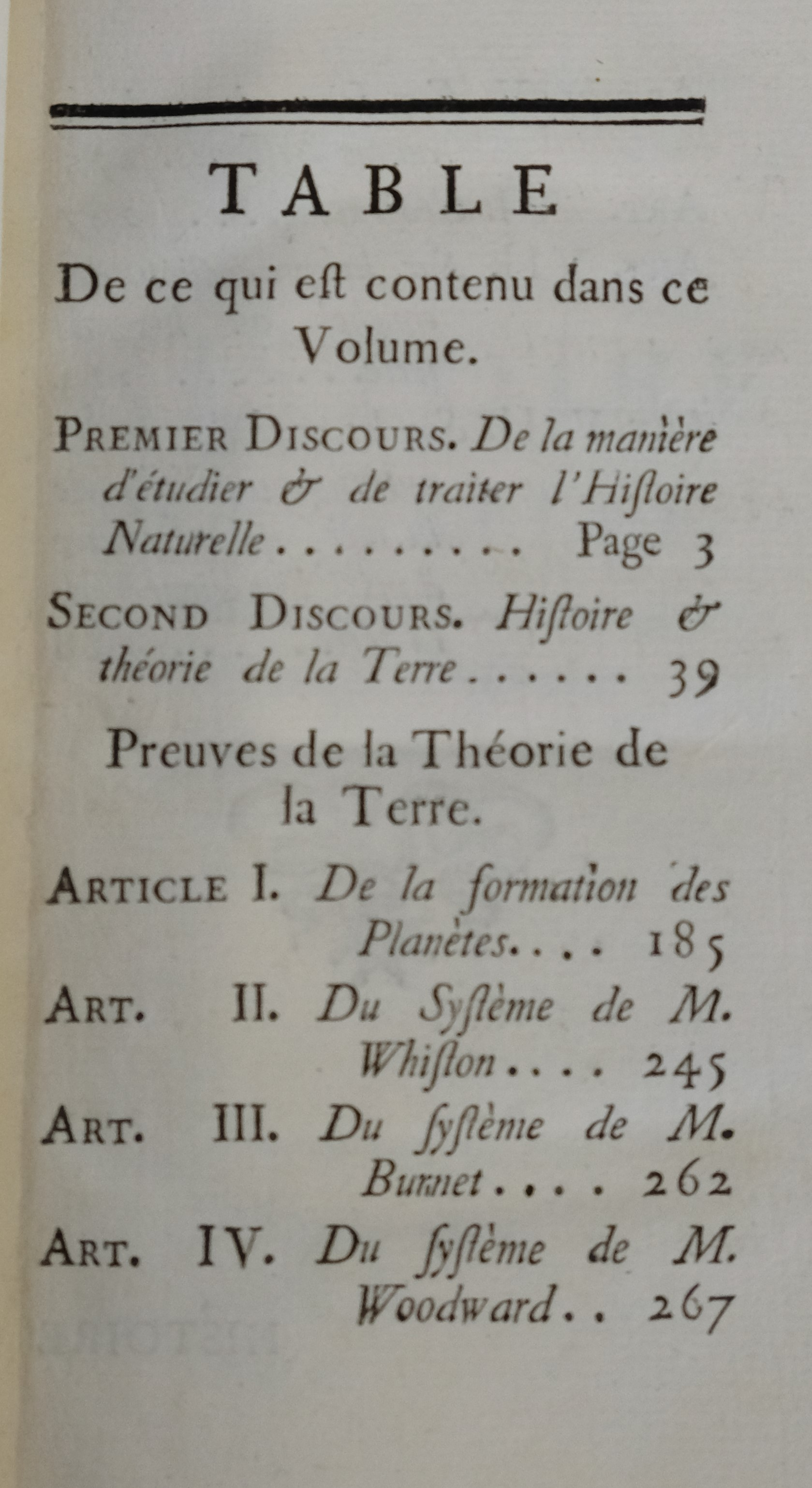
Table of contents for a 1774 edition of volume 1

== Approach ==
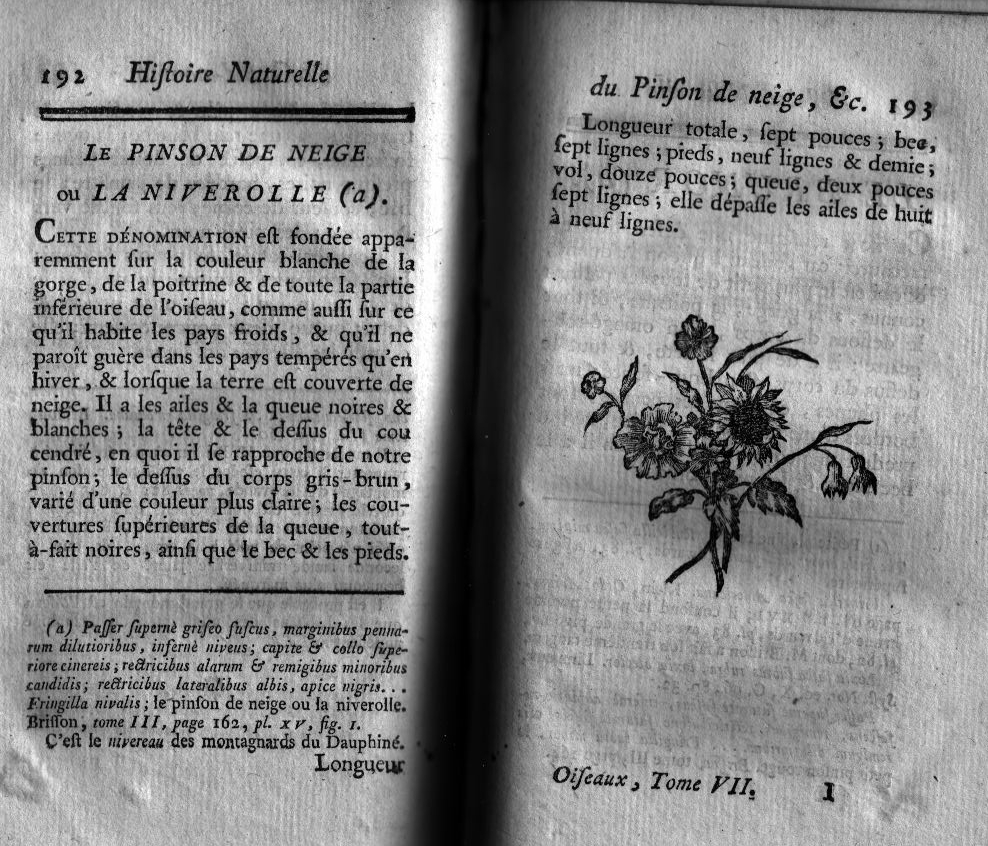
Spread of quarto pages, with decorative tail-piece illustration (1779)

Each group is introduced with a general essay. This is followed by an article, sometimes of many pages, on each animal (or other item). The article on the wolf begins with the claim that it is one of the animals with a specially strong appetite for flesh; it asserts that the animal is naturally coarse and cowardly (grossier et poltron), but becoming crafty at need, and hardy by necessity, driven by hunger. The species is named in Greek, Latin, Italian, Spanish, German, English, Swedish, and Polish. The zoological descriptions of the species by Gessner, Ray, Linnaeus, Klein and Buffon himself ("Canis ex griseo flavescens. Lupus vulgaris. Buffon. Reg. animal. pag. 235") are cited. The text is written as a continuous essay, without the sections on identification, distribution and behaviour that might have been expected from other natural histories. Parts concern human responses rather than the animal itself, as for example that the wolf likes human flesh, and the strongest wolves sometimes eat nothing else. Measurements may be included; in the case of the wolf, 41 separate measurements are tabulated, in pre-revolutionary French feet and inches (Note: The pre-revolutionary units of measurement pieds (feet) and pouces (inches) were slightly (1.066×) larger than the equivalent British feet and inches.) starting with the "Length of the whole body measured in a straight line from the end of the muzzle to the anus........3 feet. 7 inches." (1.2 m); the "Length of the largest claws" is given as "10 lines" (2.2 cm). The wolf is illustrated standing in farmland, and as a complete skeleton standing on a stone plinth in a landscape. The account of the species occupies 32 pages including illustrations.

== Editions ==
=== Buffon's original edition continued by Lacépède ===
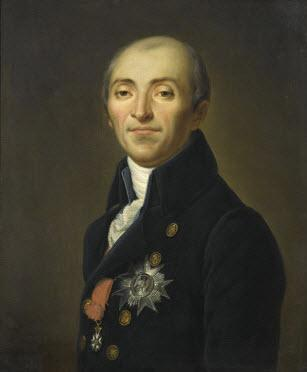
Bernard Germain de Lacépède (1756–1825) continued the Histoire Naturelle after Buffon's death.

The original edition of the Histoire Naturelle by Buffon comprised 36 volumes in quarto, divided into the following series: Histoire de la Terre et de l'Homme, Quadrupèdes, Oiseaux, Minéraux, Suppléments. Buffon edited 35 volumes in his lifetime. Soon after his death, the fifth and final volume of l’Histoire des minéraux appeared in 1788 at the Imprimerie des Bâtiments du Roi. The seventh and final volume of Suppléments by Buffon was published posthumously in 1789 through Lacépède's hands. Lacépède continued the part of the Histoire Naturelle which dealt with animals. A few months before Buffon's death, in 1788, Lacépède published, as a continuation, the first volume of his Histoire des Reptiles, on egg-laying quadrupeds. The next year, he wrote a second volume on snakes, published during the French Revolution. Between 1798 and 1803, he brought out the volume Histoire des Poissons. Lacépède made use of the notes and collections left by Philibert Commerson (1727–1773). He wrote Histoire des Cétacés which was printed in 1804. At that point, the Histoire Naturelle, by Buffon and Lacépède, thus contained 44 quarto volumes forming the definitive edition.

=== Variations in the editions by Buffon and Lacépède ===
Another edition in quarto format was printed by the Imprimerie royale in 36 volumes (1774–1804). It consisted of 28 volumes by Buffon, and 8 volumes by Lacépède. The part containing anatomical articles by Louis Jean-Marie Daubenton was dropped. The supplements were merged into the relevant articles in the main volumes.

The Imprimerie royale also published two editions of the Histoire Naturelle in duodecimo format (1752–1805), occupying 90 or 71 volumes, depending on whether or not they included the part on anatomy. In this print format, the original work by Buffon occupied 73 volumes, with the part on anatomy, or 54 volumes without it. The continuation by Lacépède took up 17 duodecimo volumes.

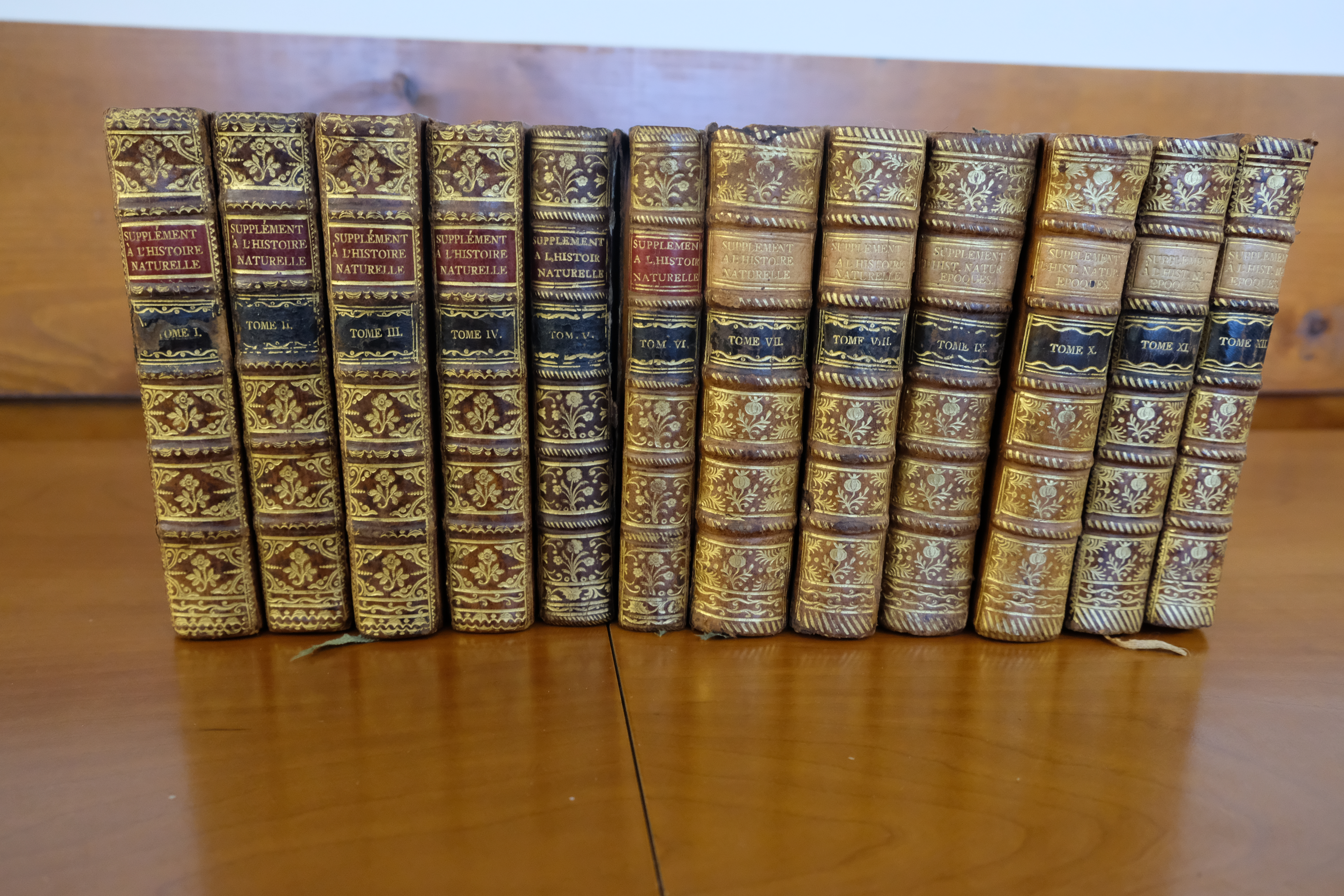
Volumes 1-12 of a 1774 edition of the Supplement

A de luxe edition of Histoire Naturelle des Oiseaux (Birds) (1771–1786) was produced by the Imprimerie royale in 10 folio and quarto volumes, with 1008 engraved and hand-coloured plates, executed under Buffon's personal supervision by Edme-Louis Daubenton, cousin and brother-in-law of Buffon's principal collaborator.

=== Translations ===
The Histoire Naturelle was translated (in whole, in part, or abridged) into languages including English, German, Swedish, Russian and Italian. R. Griffith published an early translation of the volume on The Horse in London in 1762. T. Bell published a translation of the first six volumes in London between 1775 and 1776. William Creech published an edition in Edinburgh between 1780 and 1785. T. Cadell and W. Davies published another edition in London in 1812. An abridged edition was published by Wogan, Byrne et al. in Dublin in 1791; that same year R. Morison and Son of Perth, J. and J. Fairbairn of Edinburgh and T. Kay and C. Forster of London published their edition. W. Strahan and T. Cadell published a translation with notes by the encyclopaedist William Smellie in London around 1785. Barr's Buffon in ten volumes was published in London between 1797 and 1807. W. Davidson published an abridged version including the natural history of insects taken from Swammerdam, Brookes, Goldsmith et al., with "elegant engravings on wood"; its four volumes appeared in Alnwick in 1814. German translations include those published by Grund and Holle, 1750–1775; Johann Samuel Heinsius, 1756–1782; Joseph Georg Trassler, 1784–1785; and by Pauli, 1772–1829. Italian translations include the edition published by Appresso Giuseppe Galeazzi in Milan, 1770–1773. Per Olof Gravander translated an 1802–1803 French abridgement into Swedish, publishing it in Örebro in 1806–1807. A Russian version (The General and Particular Natural History by Count Buffon; "Всеобщая и частная естественная история графа Бюффона") was brought out by The Imperial Academy of Sciences (Императорской Академией Наук) in St. Petersburg between 1789 and 1808. An abridged edition for children was published by Frederick Warne in London and Scribner, Welford and Co. c. 1870.

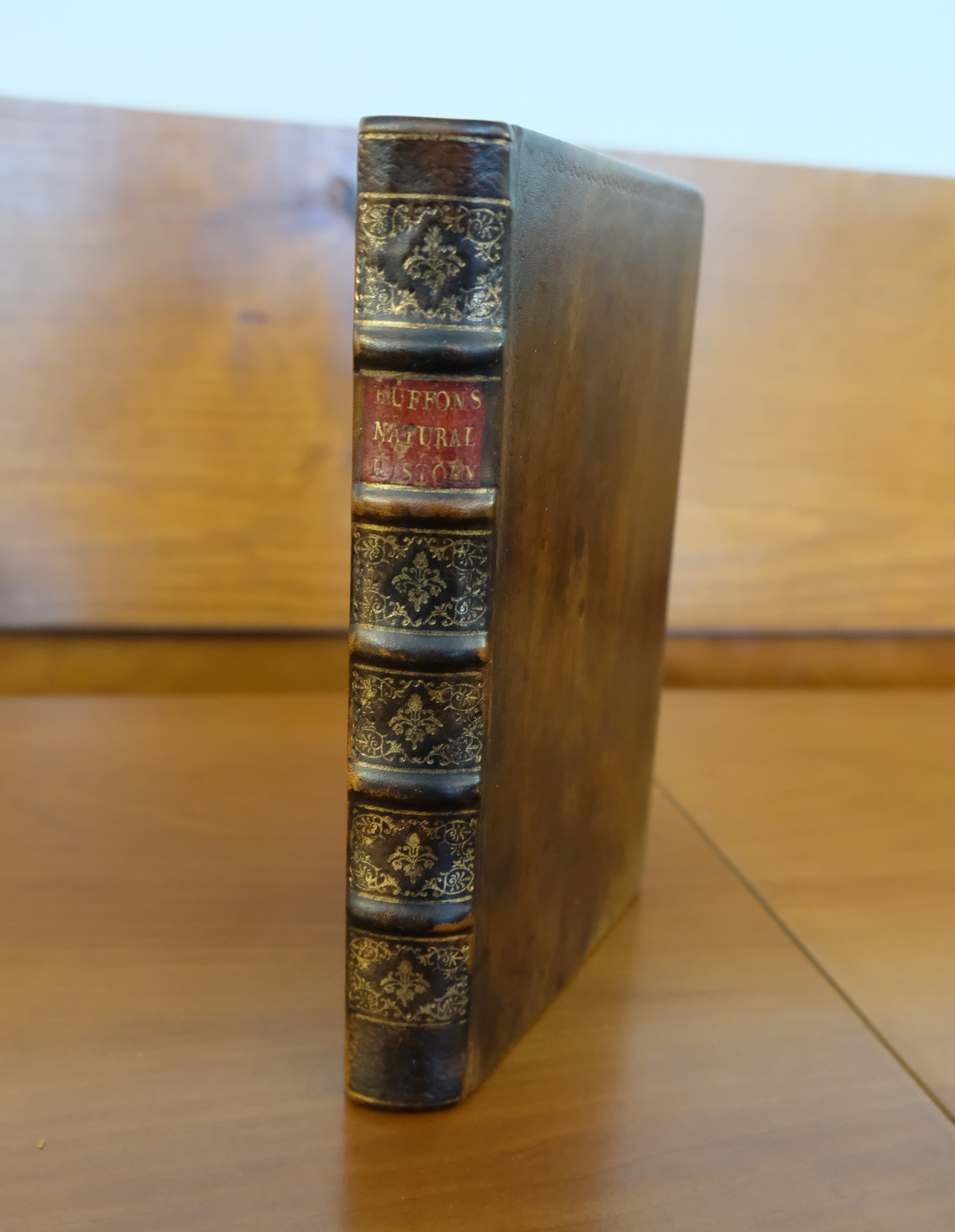
1792 English translation of "Buffon’s Natural History" (volume 1)

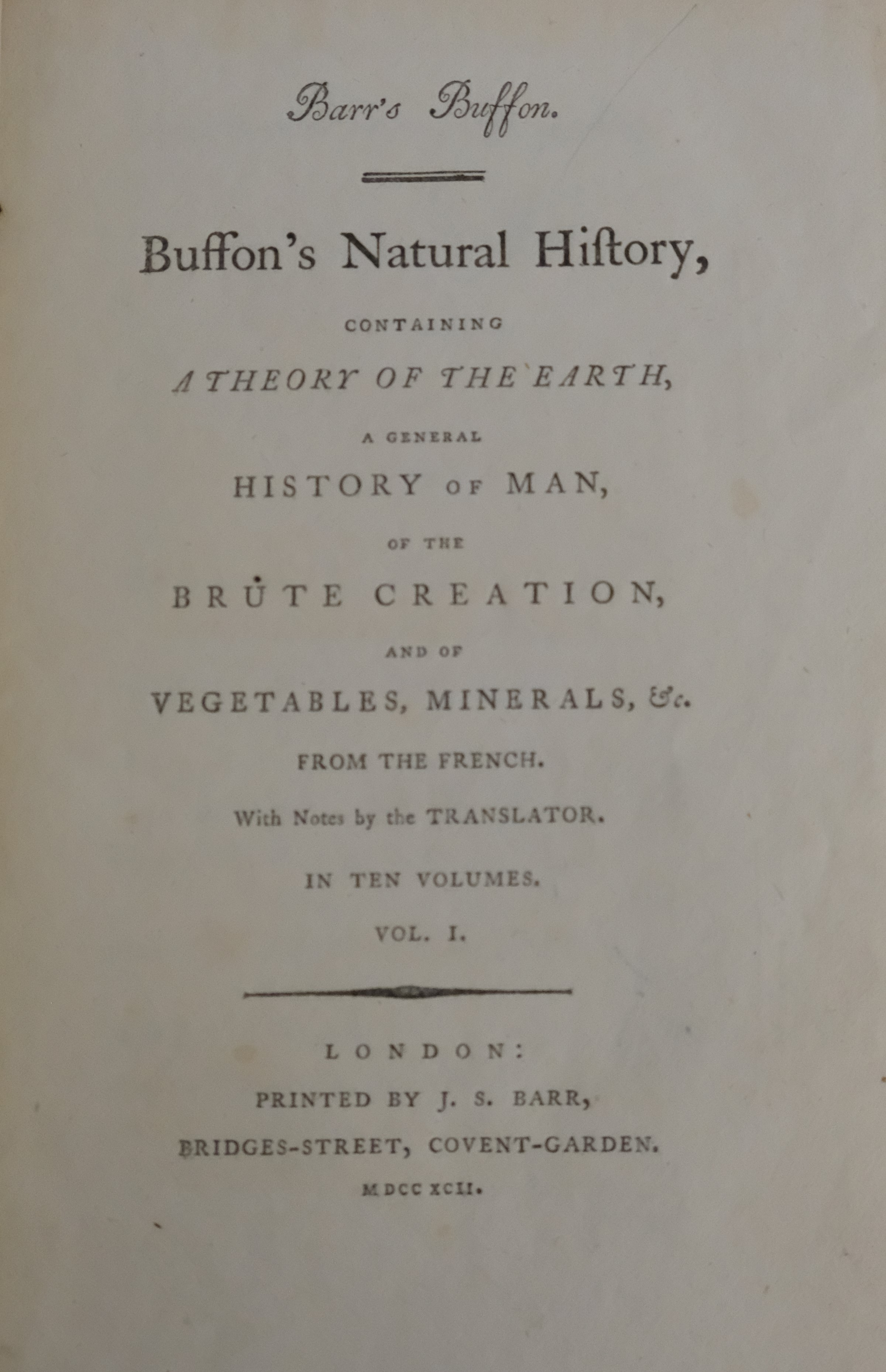
Title page

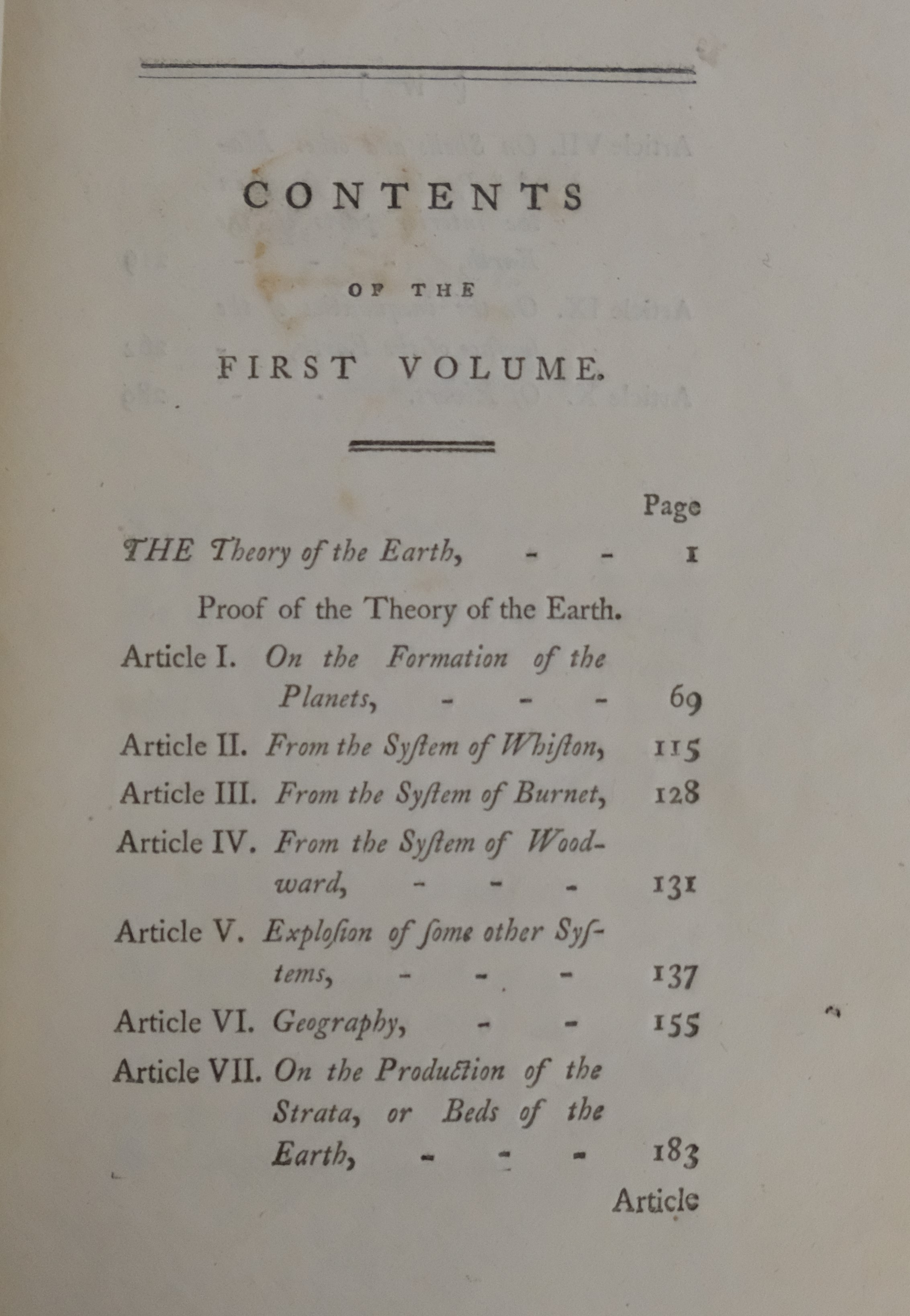
Table of contents page

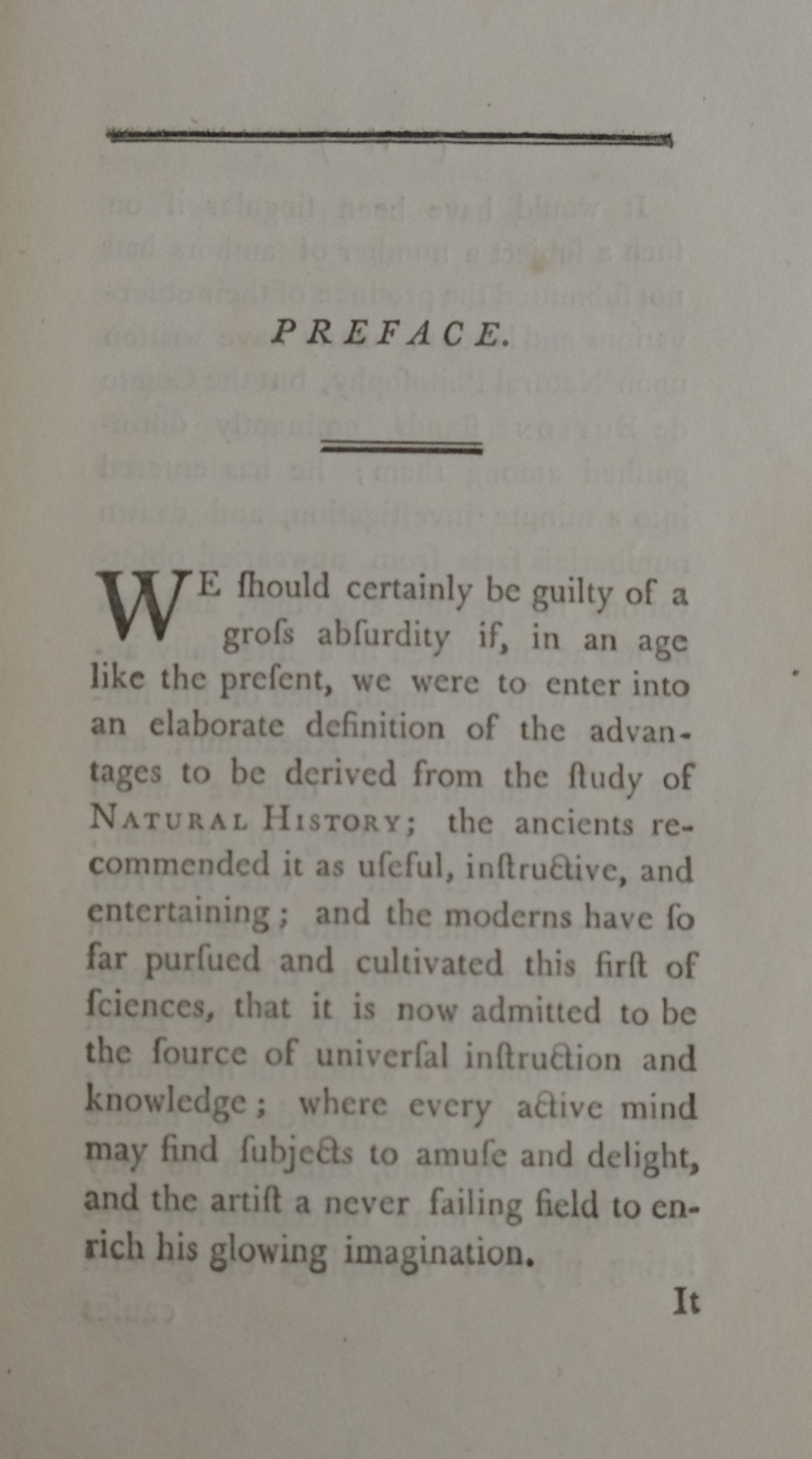
Preface page

== Reception ==
=== Contemporary ===
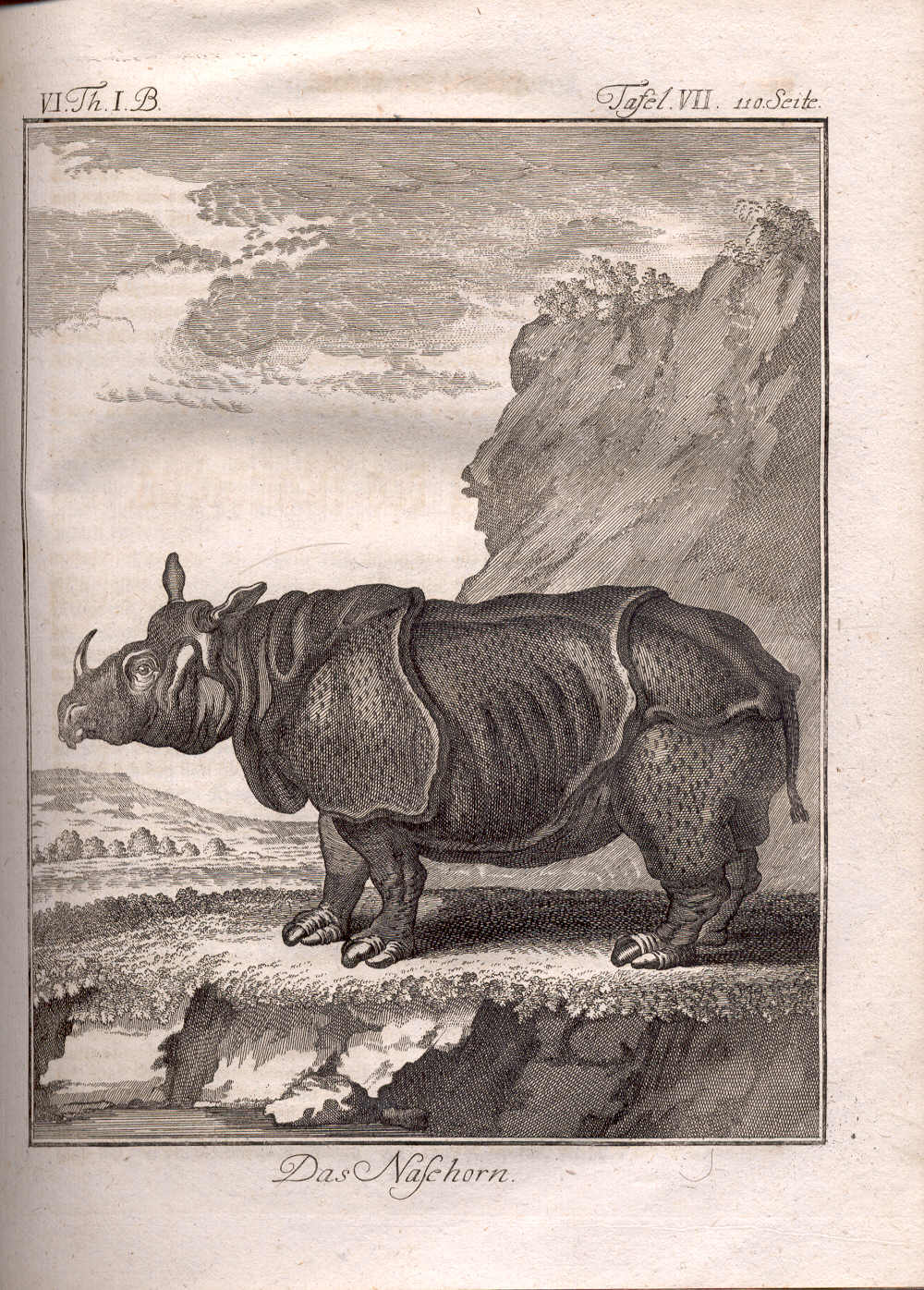
Indian rhinoceros (1767)

The Histoire Naturelle had a distinctly mixed reception in the eighteenth century. Wealthy homes in both England and France purchased copies, and the first edition was sold out within six weeks. But Buffon was criticised by some priests for suggesting (in the essay Les Epoques de Nature, Volume XXXIV) that the Earth was more than 6,000 years old and that mountains had arisen in geological time. Buffon cites as evidence that fossil sea-shells had been found at the tops of mountains; but the claim was seen as contradicting the biblical account in the Book of Genesis. Buffon also disagreed with Linnaeus's system of classifying plants as described in Systema Naturae (1735). In Buffon's view, expounded in the "Premier Discours" of the Histoire Naturelle (1749), the concept of species was entirely artificial, the only real entity in nature being the individual; as for a taxonomy based on the number of stamens or pistils in a flower, mere counting (despite Buffon's own training in mathematics) had no bearing on nature.

The Paris faculty of theology, acting as the official censor, wrote to Buffon with a list of statements in the Histoire Naturelle that were contradictory to Roman Catholic Church teaching. Buffon replied that he believed firmly in the biblical account of creation, and was able to continue printing his book, and remain in position as the leader of the 'old school', complete with his job as director of the royal botanical garden. On Buffon's death, the 19-year-old Georges Cuvier celebrated with the words "This time, the Comte de Buffon is dead and buried". Soon afterwards, the French Revolution went much further in sweeping away old attitudes to natural history, along with much else.

=== Modern ===
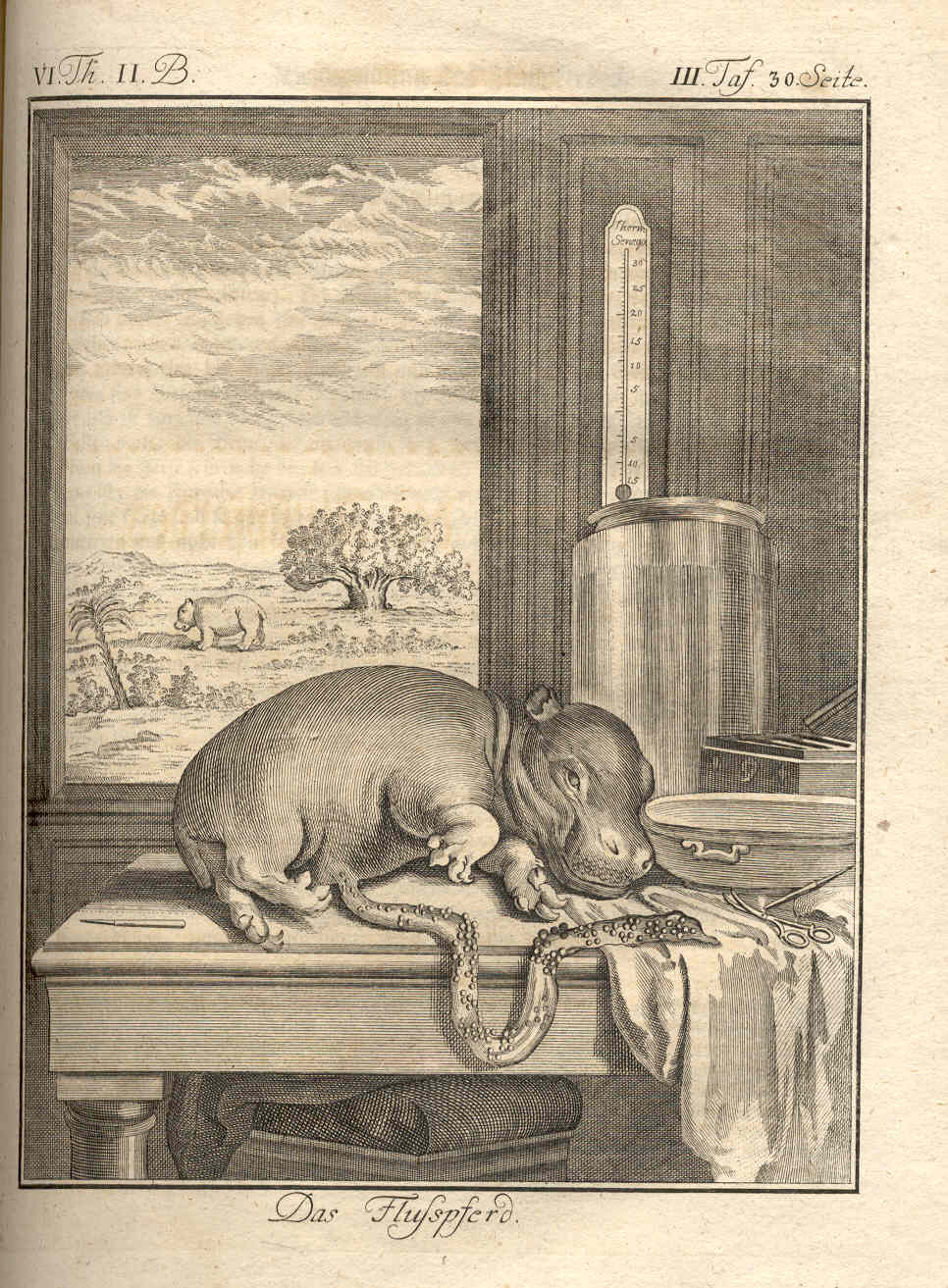
Newborn hippopotamus (1767)

==== Philosophy ====
The Stanford Encyclopedia of Philosophy calls the Histoire Naturelle "Buffon's major work", observing that "In addressing the history of the earth, Buffon also broke with the 'counter-factual' tradition of Descartes, and presented a secular and realist account of the origins of the earth and its life forms." In its view, the work created an "age of Buffon", defining what natural history itself was, while Buffon's "Discourse on Method" (unlike that of Descartes) at the start of the work argued that repeated observation could lead to a greater certainty of knowledge even than "mathematical analysis of nature". Buffon also led natural history away from the natural theology of British parson-naturalists such as John Ray. He thus offered both a new methodology and an empirical style of enquiry. Buffon's position on evolution is complex; he noted in Volume 4 from Daubenton's comparative anatomy of the horse and the donkey that species might "transform", but initially (1753) rejected the possibility. However, in doing so he changed the definition of a species from a fixed or universal class (which could not change, by definition) to "the historical succession of ancestor and descendant linked by material connection through generation", identified by the ability to mate and produce fertile offspring. Thus the horse and donkey, which produce only sterile hybrids, are seen empirically not to be the same species, even though they have similar anatomy. That empirical fact leaves open the possibility of evolution.

==== Style ====
The botanist Sandra Knapp writes that "Buffon's prose was so purple that the ideas themselves are almost hidden", observing that this was also the contemporary academic opinion. Buffon was roundly criticised by his fellow academics for writing a "purely popularizing work, empty and puffed up, with little real scientific value". Knapp notes that some quite radical ideas are to be found in his work, but that these are almost invisible, given the language they are cloaked in. She quotes Buffon's dramatic description of the lion, which along with the engraving in her view "emphasized both the lion's regal bearing and personality not only in his text but also in the illustration... A reader was left in no doubt as to the importance and character of the animal." She concludes "No wonder the cultured aristocratic public lapped it up – the text reads more like a romantic novel than a dry scientific treatise".

==== Evolutionary thought ====
The evolutionary biologist Ernst Mayr comments that "In this monumental and fascinating Histoire naturelle, Buffon dealt in a stimulating manner with almost all the problems that would subsequently be raised by evolutionists. Written in a brilliant style, this work was read in French or in one of the numerous translations by every educated person in Europe". Mayr argued that "virtually all the well-known writers of the Enlightenment" were "Buffonians", and calls Buffon "the father of all thought in natural history in the second half of the eighteenth century".

Mayr notes that Buffon was not an "evolutionist", but was certainly responsible for creating the great amount of interest in natural history in France. He agrees that Buffon's thought is hard to classify and even self-contradictory, and that the theologians forced him to avoid writing some of his opinions openly. Mayr argues however that Buffon was "fully aware of the possibility of 'common descent', and was perhaps the first author ever to articulate it clearly", quoting Buffon at length, starting with "Not only the ass and the horse, but also man, the apes, the quadrupeds, and all the animals might be regarded as constituting but a single family", and later "that man and ape have a common origin", and that "the power of nature...with sufficient time, she has been able from a single being to derive all the other organized beings". Mayr notes, however, that Buffon immediately rejects the suggestion and offers three arguments against it, namely that no new species have arisen in historical times; that hybrid infertility firmly separates species; and that animals intermediate between, say, the horse and the donkey are not seen (in the fossil record).
