= Larrey, Côte-d'Or =

Larrey
- Commune
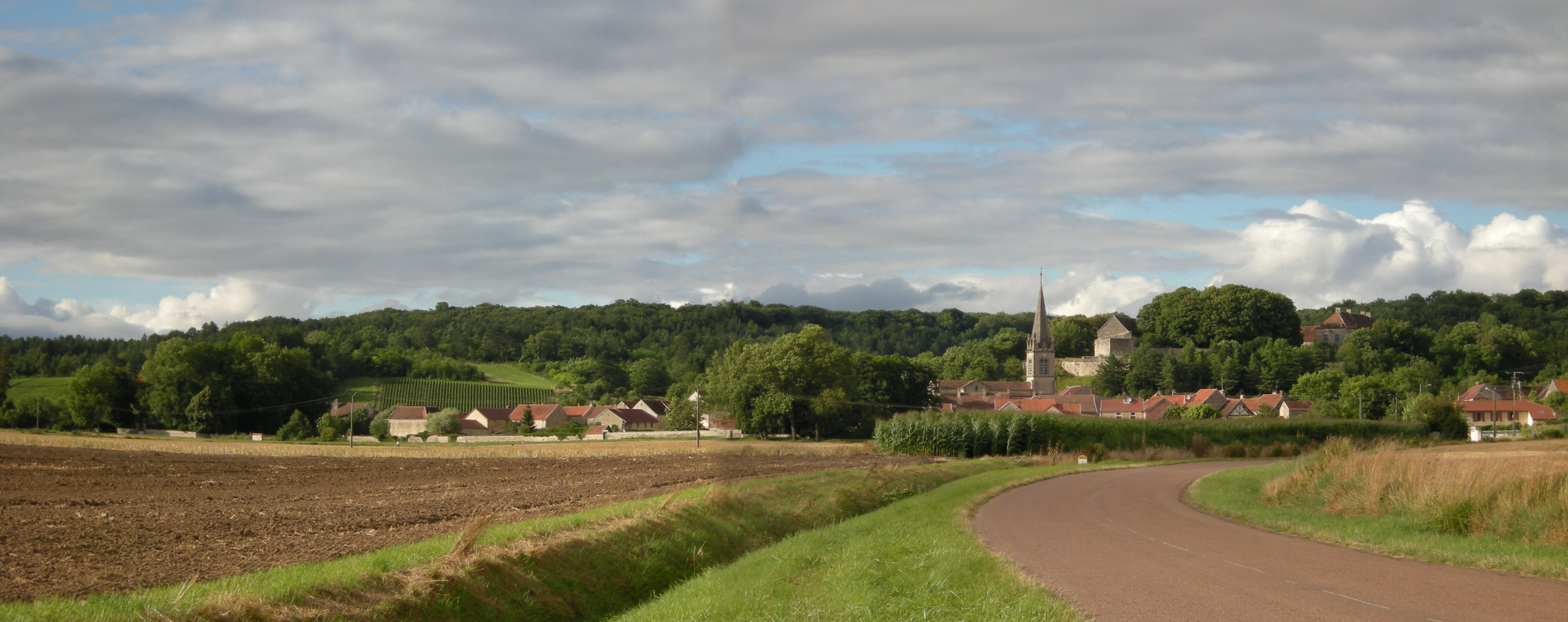
- A general view of Larrey

- Coat of arms
- Location of Larrey
- Location within France Location within Bourgogne-Franche-Comté
- Coordinates: 47°53′06″N 4°26′11″E
- Country: France
- Region: Bourgogne-Franche-Comté
- Department: Côte-d'Or
- Arrondissement: Montbard
- Canton: Châtillon-sur-Seine

Government
  - Mayor (2020–2026): Bernard Soupault
- Area^{1}: 18.51 km^{2} (7.15 sq mi)
- Elevation: 310 m (1,020 ft)
- Highest elevation: 317 m (1,040 ft)
- Lowest elevation: 208 m (682 ft)
- Population (2023): 95
  - Density: 5.1/km^{2} (13/sq mi)
- Time zone: UTC+01:00 (CET)
  - Summer (DST): UTC+02:00 (CEST)
- INSEE/Postal code: 21343 /21330
- ^{1} French Land Register data, which excludes lakes, ponds, glaciers > 1 km^{2} (0.386 sq mi or 247 acres) and river estuaries.

Larrey (French pronunciation: [laʁɛ]) is a commune in the Côte-d'Or department in Bourgogne-Franche-Comté in eastern France. It is situated on the Cremant Road and near the future National Park of Forests of Champagne and Burgundy.

== Geography ==
The village is situated at 231 metres above sea-level, and the chateau at 263 metres. Larrey lies at the foot of the hills of the Châtillonnais forest. Wine grapes are grown on the hills.

== History ==
In 1430, the chateau was besieged during the Hundred Years War. On 26 February 1430 the Burgundian nobility gathered at Semur-en-Auxois to resist the Duke of Burgundy's enemies, who had recently captured the chateau in Larrey. The enemies in question were the English, who had seized the possessions of the Duke of Burgundy at Candlemas (about 2 February 1430). On or around 7 March, Burgundian troops besieged the chateau, which was finally retaken on Quasimodo Sunday 1430.

== Sites and monuments ==
A chateau built in 1230 by Eudes de Grancey, one of the most powerful lords in northern Burgundy, overlooks the village. The chateau was besieged in 1430. It was modified and enlarged between the 15th and the 17th centuries. During the 19th century its condition deteriorated when it was used as a farm. Parts of the chateau were registered as an Historic Monument on 13 March 1972:

- the façades and roofs of the main building located to the east of the inner courtyard, including both entrance towers, as well as the stairwell;
- the façades and roofs, as well as the vaulted room of the building situated to the west of the interior courtyard;
- the balustrade of the terrace.

The chateau is private property and is not open to visitors.

There are two churches in the village, only one of which still belongs to Larrey. Saint-Roch Church, dating from 1883, is located in the heart of the village. The church replaced the former chapel founded in 1615 by Regnault Martin. Several of the stained-glass windows were funded by donations, and the names of the donators were inscribed on the windows. The second church is Saint Germain d'Auxerre, which stands on a hill outside the village. It was built in the first half of the 16th century (the choir is dated 1543) restored in the 19th century, and registered as an Historic Monument in 1925. It was only in the 20th century that ownership of the church was transferred to the neighboring village, Poinçon-lès-Larrey, which no longer had a church of its own (the chapel had fallen into disrepair), while Larrey had two. There are several ancient crosses in the neighborhood. The Maison des Sœurs, a former nunnery, was renovated in 2010 and is now the town hall.

An attractive ancient lavoir, located on the town square, was renovated in 2011.

== Population ==
Historical population
Year	Pop.	±% p.a.
1968	107	—
1975	92	−2.13%
1982	104	+1.77%
1990	92	−1.52%
1999	67	−3.46%
2007	93	+4.18%
2012	101	+1.66%
2017	92	−1.85%
2023	95	+0.54%
Source: INSEE

== See also ==
- Communes of the Côte-d'Or department
