= Edmé Régnier L'Aîné =

French pistol maker (1751–1825)

Coordinates: 48.861087°N 2.393247°E

Edme Régnier
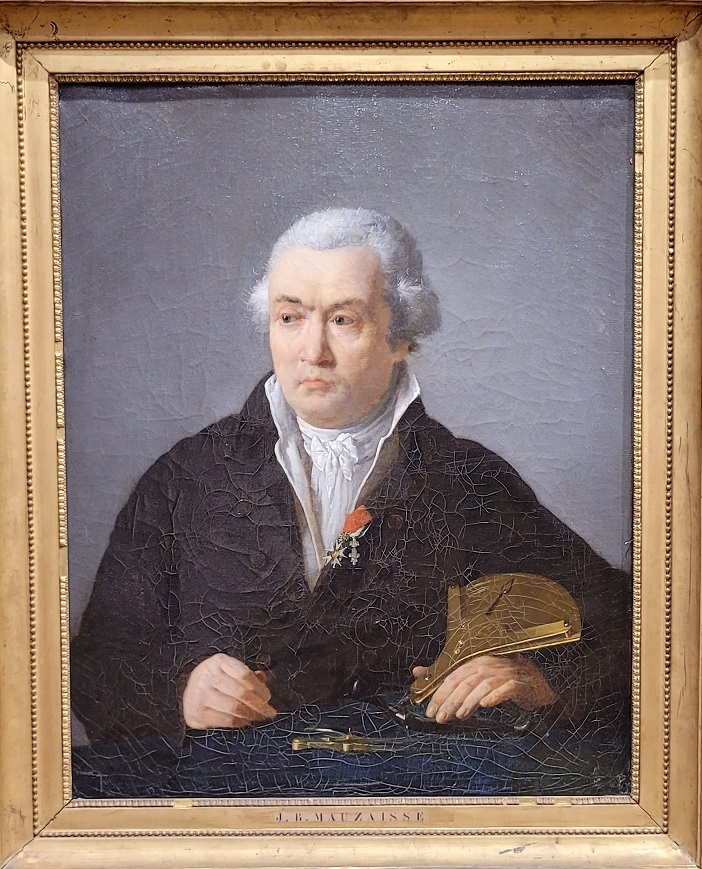
- Portrait of Edme Régnier by Jean-Baptiste Mauzaisse
- Born: 15 July 1751; Semur-en-Auxois, France
- Died: 10 June 1825 (aged 73); Paris France
- Resting place: Père Lachaise Cemetery
- Occupations: Mechanic, inventor, engineer, pistol maker
- Known for: Dynamometer, combination lock
- Awards: Knight of the Legion of Honour (1814)

Edmé Régnier L'Aîné (15 July 1751 – 10 June 1825) was a French pistol maker and engineer, born in Semur-en-Auxois in 1751 and died in Paris in 1825.

He became the inspector of hand firearms production under the Committee of Public Safety. Subsequently, he was appointed the first Director of the Musée d'Artillerie in the cloister of the Church of Saint Thomas d'Asquin, Paris.

== Régnier's dynamometer ==
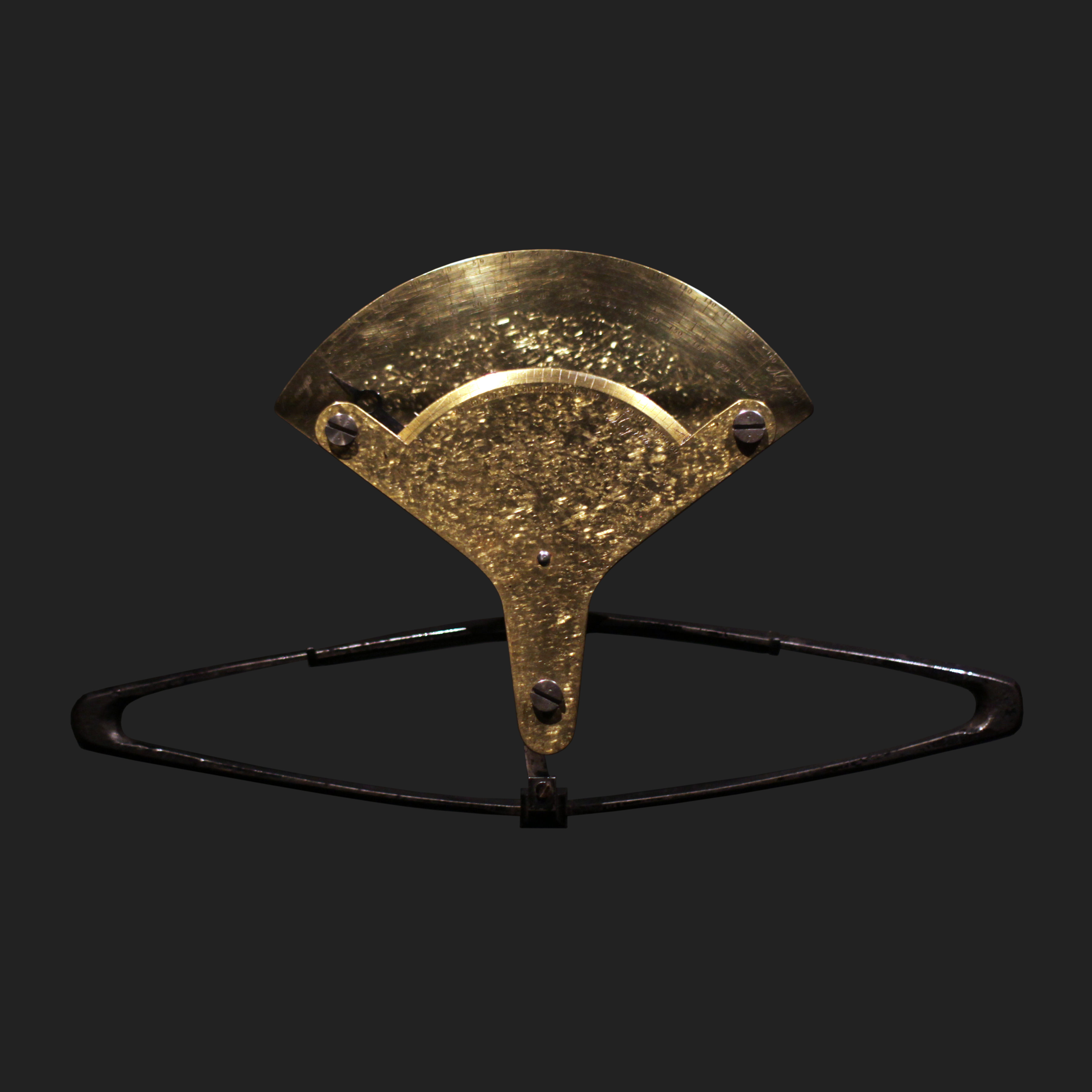
Régnier's dynamometer, on display at the Musée des Arts et Métiers, Paris.

In the early 1780s, Philippe Guéneau de Montbeillard and Georges-Louis Leclerc, comte de Buffon encouraged Régnier to begin the design a device that could compare muscular strength. The physicist Charles-Augustin de Coulomb further encouraged him, and the result was made known to the public in 1798 and became known as Régnier's dynamometer.

Régnier's dynamometer was one of a series of innovations related to public safety and rifle safety and adopting recent innovations to public need. A list of his innovations was published in around 1801.

== Combination Lock ==
According to the ASSA Abloy website, Régnier also invented a combination lock that could change its combination, by doubling the number of rings. Usually, this type of lock has a number of rotatable rings that release the shackle only when all of them are set to a specific position. The ability to change the combination made it more secure and popular.
