= Poinçon-lès-Larrey =

- Commune
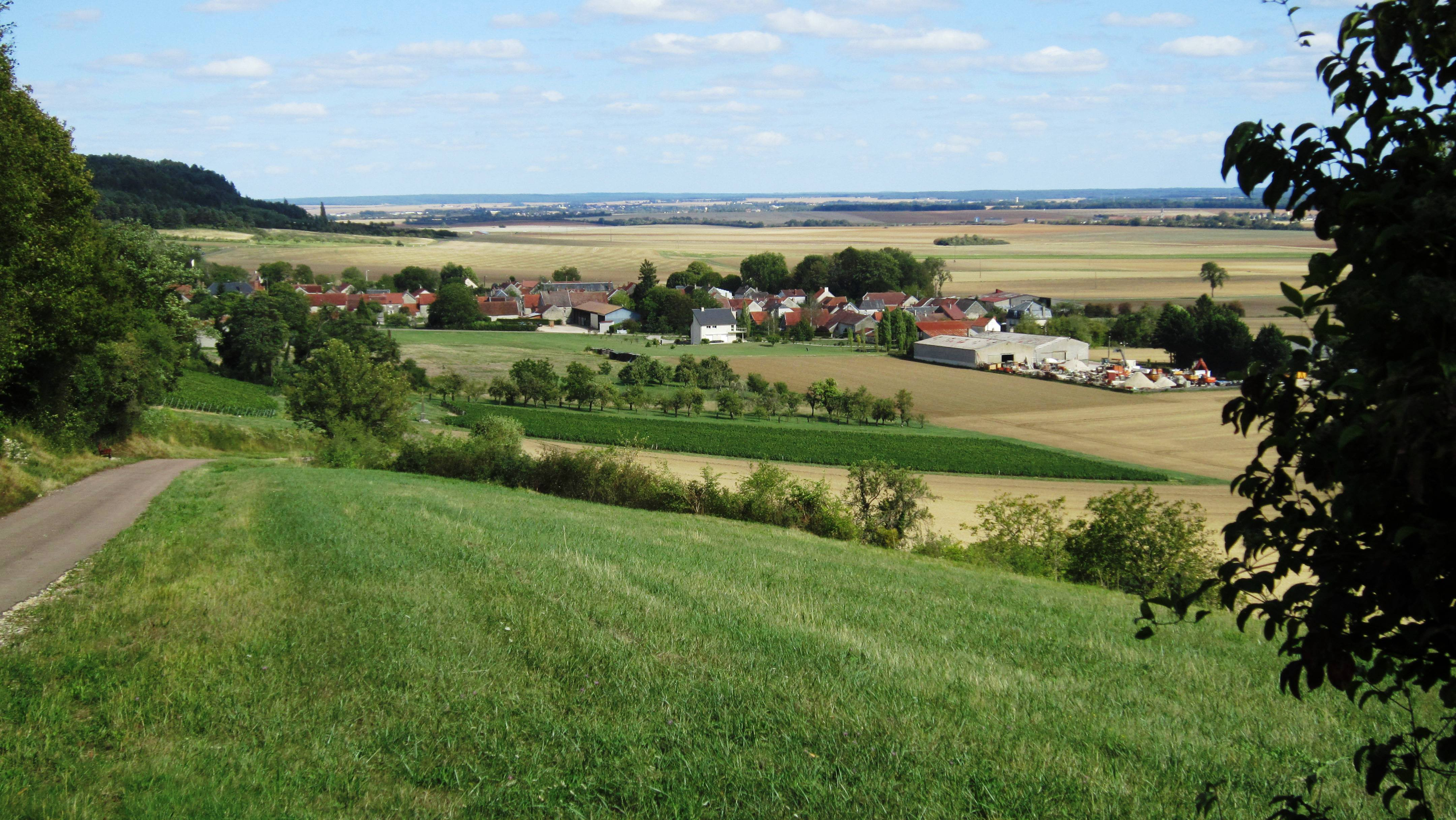
- A general view of Poinçon-lès-Larrey
- Location of Poinçon-lès-Larrey
- Location within France Location within Bourgogne-Franche-Comté
- Coordinates: 47°53′01″N 4°27′18″E
- Country: France
- Region: Bourgogne-Franche-Comté
- Department: Côte-d'Or
- Arrondissement: Montbard
- Canton: Châtillon-sur-Seine

Government
  - Mayor (2020–2026): Patrice Chodat
- Area^{1}: 10.42 km^{2} (4.02 sq mi)
- Elevation: 228 m (748 ft)
- Highest elevation: 328 m (1,076 ft)
- Lowest elevation: 216 m (709 ft)
- Population (2023): 197
  - Density: 18.9/km^{2} (49.0/sq mi)
- Time zone: UTC+01:00 (CET)
  - Summer (DST): UTC+02:00 (CEST)
- INSEE/Postal code: 21488 /21330
- ^{1} French Land Register data, which excludes lakes, ponds, glaciers > 1 km^{2} (0.386 sq mi or 247 acres) and river estuaries.

Poinçon-lès-Larrey (French pronunciation: [pwɛ̃sɔ̃ lɛ laʁɛ], literally Poinçon near Larrey) is a commune in the Côte-d'Or department in eastern France.

== Population ==
Historical population
Year	Pop.	±% p.a.
1968	230	—
1975	235	+0.31%
1982	236	+0.06%
1990	199	−2.11%
1999	196	−0.17%
2007	201	+0.32%
2012	201	+0.00%
2017	194	−0.71%
2023	197	+0.26%
Source: INSEE

== See also ==
- Communes of the Côte-d'Or department
