= Jacques de Sève =

French illustrator

Jacques de Sève (fl. 1742 – 1788) was a French illustrator.

== Career ==
De Sève was commissioned by Georges-Louis Leclerc, Comte de Buffon to provide the quadruped illustrations for Histoire naturelle, générale et particulière (1749–1778, in 36 volumes) (François-Nicolas Martinet did the birds) and then Buffon's Recueil de Vingtquatre Plantes et Fleurs (1772). He also illustrated work by Duhamel du Monceau, Claude Perrault (later editions) and parts of Encyclopédie Méthodique. His illustrations are sometimes exact anatomical representations or show the animals against landscape backgrounds. They were engraved by Louis Le Grand.

His son, Jacques Eustache also worked as an artist and engraver, contributing to the later Suites à Buffon. Together father and son produced thousands of illustrations.
