= Gabriel Bexon =

Gabriel-Léopold-Charles-Amé Bexon or Abbe Bexon (10 March 1747 – 15 February 1784) was a French clergyman and a naturalist who corresponded with Buffon and wrote a few books.

Bexon was born in Remiremont to lawyer Amé Bexon and Marthe Pillement. He studied at the seminary in Toul and then received a doctorate in theology from the University of Besançon around 1766-67 and became a subdeacon in Toul. He was ordained in 1772.

His publications included Catéchisme d’agriculture and Le système de la fertilisation (1768). He assisted Comte de Buffon in his works on natural history, especially the volume on birds. He died in Paris.
