= Semur-en-Auxois =

- Commune
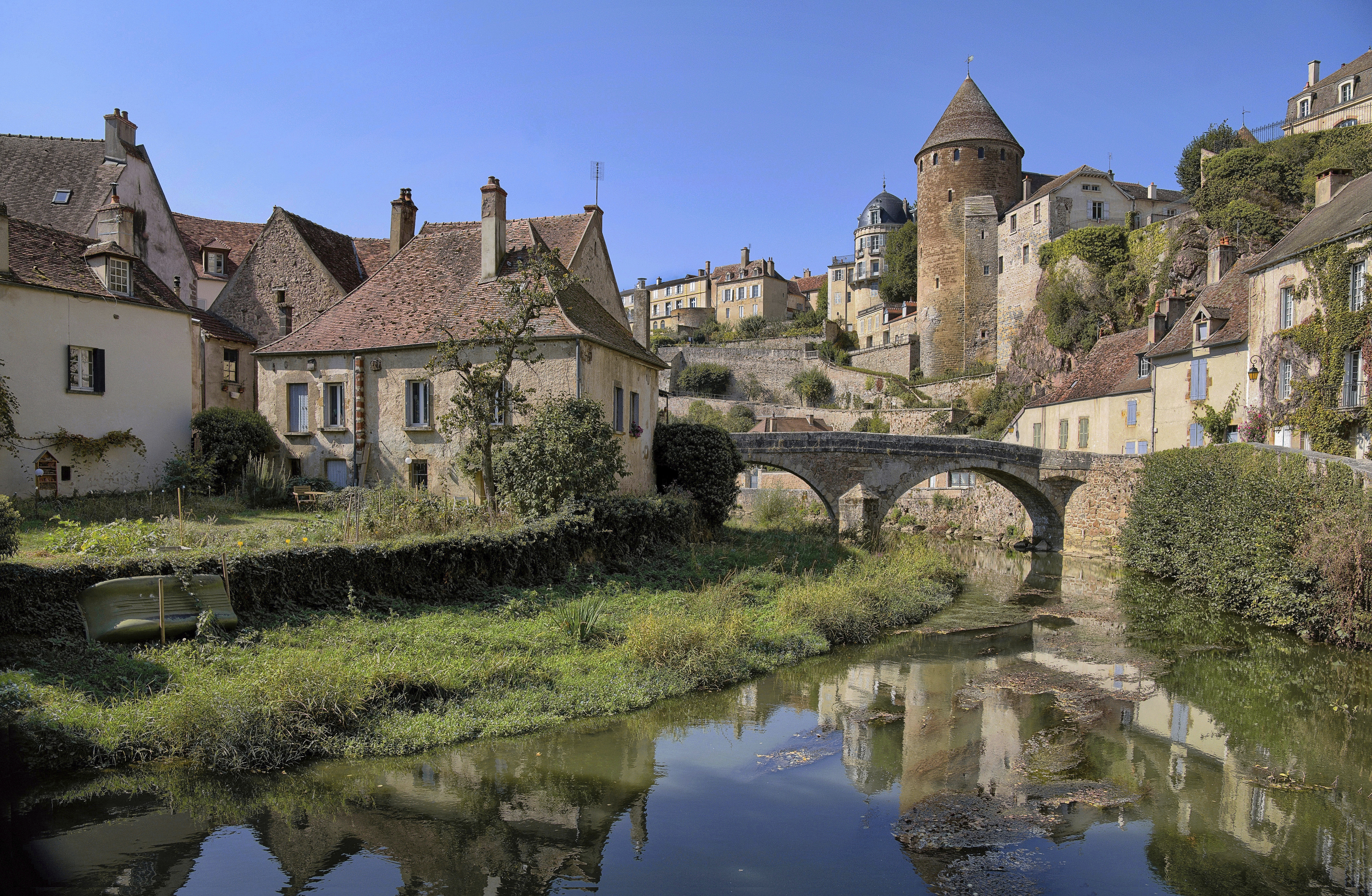
- The Pinard Bridge in Semur-en-Auxois

- Coat of arms
- Location of Semur-en-Auxois
- Location within France Location within Bourgogne-Franche-Comté
- Coordinates: 47°29′29″N 4°20′01″E
- Country: France
- Region: Bourgogne-Franche-Comté
- Department: Côte-d'Or
- Arrondissement: Montbard
- Canton: Semur-en-Auxois

Government
  - Mayor (2020–2026): Catherine Sadon
- Area^{1}: 19.14 km^{2} (7.39 sq mi)
- Elevation: 286 m (938 ft)
- Highest elevation: 423 m (1,388 ft)
- Lowest elevation: 237 m (778 ft)
- Population (2023): 3,986
  - Density: 208.3/km^{2} (539.4/sq mi)
- Time zone: UTC+01:00 (CET)
  - Summer (DST): UTC+02:00 (CEST)
- INSEE/Postal code: 21603 /21140
- ^{1} French Land Register data, which excludes lakes, ponds, glaciers > 1 km^{2} (0.386 sq mi or 247 acres) and river estuaries.

Semur-en-Auxois (French pronunciation: [səmyʁ ɑ̃.n‿o(k)swa], lit. 'Semur in Auxois') is a commune of the Côte-d'Or department in eastern France. The politician François Patriat, the engineers Edmé Régnier L'Aîné (1751–1825) and Émile Dorand (1866-1922), and the Encyclopédiste Philippe Guéneau de Montbeillard (1720–1785) were born in Semur-en-Auxois, while the military engineer Vauban (1633–1707) was educated at the Carmelite college.

Semur-en-Auxois has a medieval core, built on a pink granite bluff more than half-encircled by the River Armançon. The river formerly provided motive power for tanneries and mills, but its flow is now somewhat reduced by the Lac de Pont. The dam was built upstream in the 19th century to provide water for the Canal de Bourgogne.

== Sport ==
Semur-en-Auxois was the start of Stage 6 in the 2007 Tour de France. In the 2024 Tour de France, it was the start of Stage 8.

== Population ==
Historical population

Year	Pop.	±% p.a.
1793	4,617	—
1800	4,291	−1.04%
1806	5,065	+2.80%
1821	5,053	−0.02%
1836	4,035	−1.49%
1846	4,129	+0.23%
1851	3,971	−0.78%
1856	3,708	−1.36%
1861	3,590	−0.64%
1866	3,760	+0.93%
1872	3,765	+0.02%
1876	4,130	+2.34%
1881	4,307	+0.84%
1886	3,894	−2.00%
1891	3,908	+0.07%
1896	3,835	−0.38%
1901	3,655	−0.96%
1906	3,512	−0.80%

Year	Pop.	±% p.a.
1911	3,411	−0.58%
1921	3,009	−1.25%
1926	3,042	+0.22%
1931	3,024	−0.12%
1936	3,017	−0.05%
1946	3,257	+0.77%
1954	3,324	+0.25%
1962	3,399	+0.28%
1968	3,812	+1.93%
1975	4,334	+1.85%
1982	4,619	+0.91%
1990	4,545	−0.20%
1999	4,453	−0.23%
2007	4,195	−0.74%
2012	4,138	−0.27%
2017	4,139	+0.00%
2023	3,986	−0.63%

Source: EHESS and INSEE (1968-2023)

== Sights ==
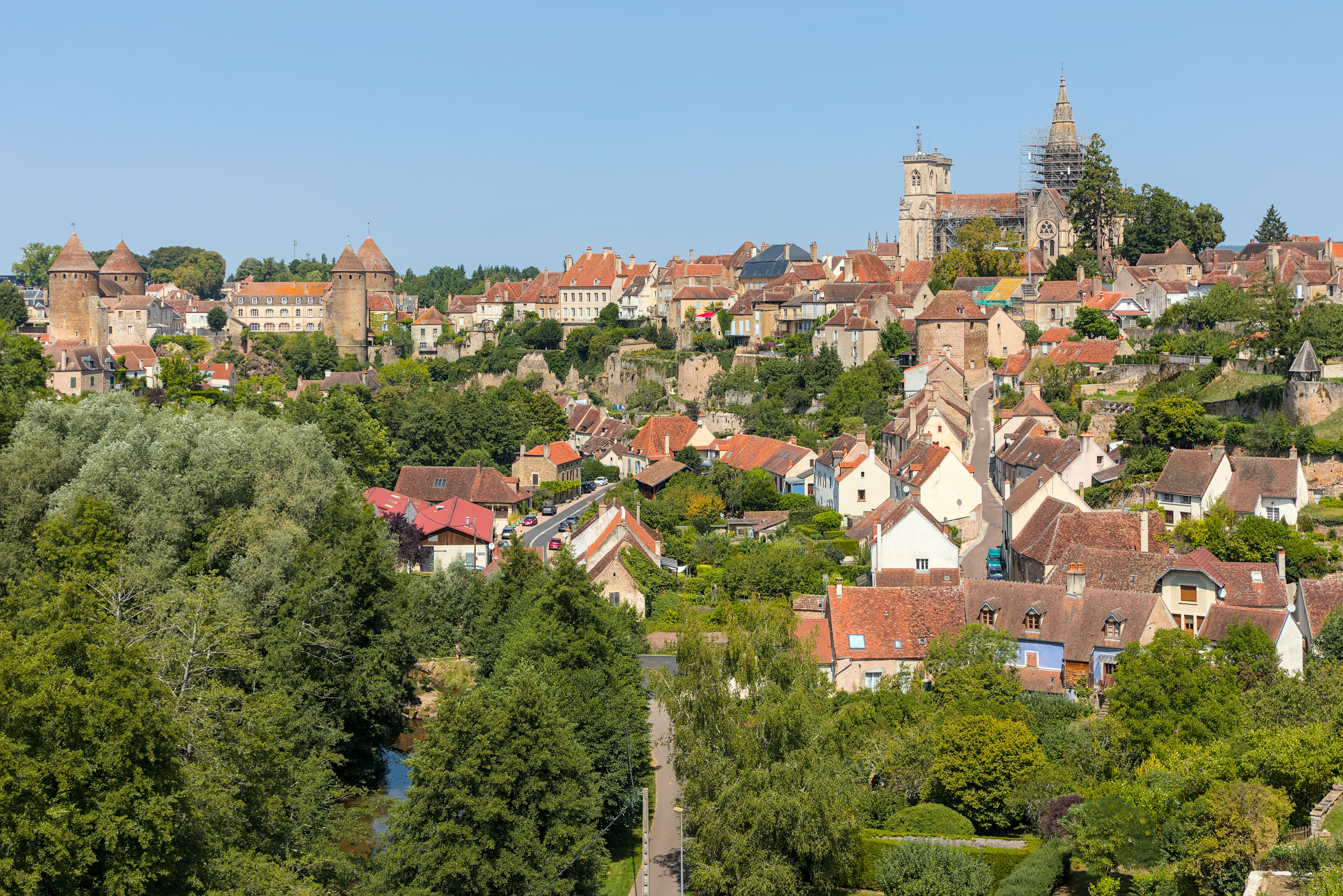
An overview of Semur-en-Auxois

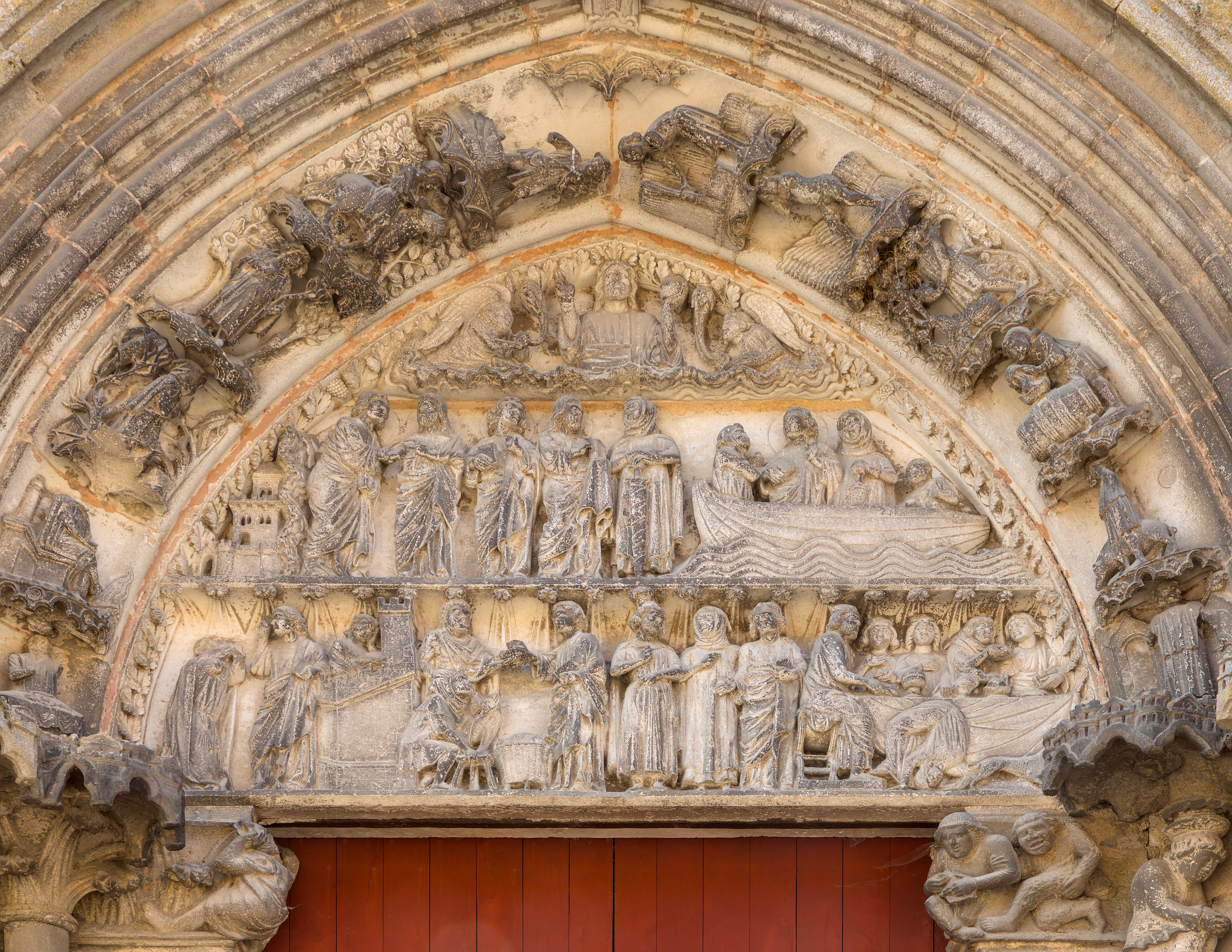
The North tympanum of Collégiale Notre-Dame

- The church, La Collégiale Notre-Dame, was founded in 1225 and built in flamboyant Gothic style. It was restored in the 19th century by Viollet-le-Duc. The north tympanum depicts the legend of St. Thomas.
- La porte Sauvigny, built in the 15th century, marks the entrance to the city
- The fortified castle, built in the 13th century and dismantled in the 17th century. Parts visible today are:
  - La tour de l'Orle d'Or, with a height of 44 metres and walls 5 metres thick
  - La tour de la Gehenne
  - La tour de la Prison
  - La tour Margot, behind the theatre.
- Bridges of the city crossing the Armançon:
  - Le pont Joly, which provides a view of the city
  - Le pont Pinard
  - Le pont des Minimes
- The ramparts provide a promenade with views of the river

== Climate ==
Climate data for Semur-en-Auxois (1991–2020 averages)
Month	Jan	Feb	Mar	Apr	May	Jun	Jul	Aug	Sep	Oct	Nov	Dec	Year
Record high °C (°F)	16.8 (62.2)	21.7 (71.1)	24.7 (76.5)	28.3 (82.9)	31.8 (89.2)	37.5 (99.5)	39.8 (103.6)	40.5 (104.9)	34.9 (94.8)	31.1 (88.0)	21.8 (71.2)	18.3 (64.9)	40.5 (104.9)
Mean daily maximum °C (°F)	6.2 (43.2)	7.6 (45.7)	12.2 (54.0)	15.5 (59.9)	19.5 (67.1)	23.5 (74.3)	26.0 (78.8)	25.9 (78.6)	21.3 (70.3)	16.2 (61.2)	10.3 (50.5)	7.0 (44.6)	15.9 (60.6)
Daily mean °C (°F)	3.3 (37.9)	3.9 (39.0)	7.3 (45.1)	10.0 (50.0)	13.9 (57.0)	17.6 (63.7)	19.9 (67.8)	19.7 (67.5)	15.6 (60.1)	11.8 (53.2)	7.0 (44.6)	4.1 (39.4)	11.2 (52.2)
Mean daily minimum °C (°F)	0.3 (32.5)	0.2 (32.4)	2.4 (36.3)	4.5 (40.1)	8.3 (46.9)	11.7 (53.1)	13.7 (56.7)	13.6 (56.5)	10.0 (50.0)	7.5 (45.5)	3.6 (38.5)	1.3 (34.3)	6.4 (43.5)
Record low °C (°F)	−24.0 (−11.2)	−16.8 (1.8)	−15.2 (4.6)	−7.3 (18.9)	−2.0 (28.4)	2.1 (35.8)	4.9 (40.8)	0.4 (32.7)	0.5 (32.9)	−6.1 (21.0)	−10.2 (13.6)	−17.9 (−0.2)	−24.0 (−11.2)
Average precipitation mm (inches)	61.8 (2.43)	53.5 (2.11)	52.7 (2.07)	63.6 (2.50)	77.4 (3.05)	67.1 (2.64)	63.1 (2.48)	59.0 (2.32)	64.7 (2.55)	73.0 (2.87)	73.8 (2.91)	68.3 (2.69)	778.0 (30.63)
Average precipitation days (≥ 1.0 mm)	11.6	10.6	10.6	10.4	11.3	9.1	8.5	8.4	9.0	11.3	11.9	13.0	125.6
Source: Meteociel

== See also ==
- The Sinemurian Age of the Jurassic Period of geological time is named for Semur-en-Auxois
- Communes of the Côte-d'Or department
