= Philippe Guéneau de Montbeillard =

French naturalist

- Born: 2 April 1720; Semur-en-Auxois
- Died: 28 November 1785 (aged 65); Paris
- Occupations: Lawyer; Naturalist
- Spouse: Elisabeth Potot de Montbeillard

Philippe Guéneau de Montbeillard also Philibert Guéneau de Montbeillard (2 April 1720 – 28 November 1785) was an eighteenth-century French lawyer, writer, naturalist, and contributor to the Encyclopédie.

== Biography ==
The son of the aristocratic lawyer and member of parlement François Marie Guéneau (1686-1742) and his wife Marie Colombe Meney (1685-1768), Philippe first studied in Paris from 1732 to 1734 at the Collège de Navarre and the Collège d'Harcourt and then in 1735 at the Collège of the Oratory in Troyes. He studied law in Dijon at the Faculty of Law. He had an older brother, François Guéneau (1717-1788), and a younger sister, Charlotte Guéneau (born about 1722).

In 1742 he became a lawyer. He later lived for around a decade in Paris, where he befriended Denis Diderot, a co-editor of the Encyclopédie. Gueneau contributed a single article to that work, "Étendue", a philosophical treatment of the notion of extension.

In 1755 Guéneau returned to Semur-en-Auxois. There he married Elisabeth Benigne de Potot Montbeillard on 23 November 1756 with whom he had a son, François Guéneau de Montbeillard (1759-1847), who took on a military career as a "capitaine de la cavalerie." In 1766 Gueneau inoculated his son against smallpox, a controversial procedure at the time, and announced the success of the operation in a paper read to the Académie des Sciences, Arts et Belles-Lettres de Dijon.

From 1754 to 1787, Guéneau edited the Collection académique, a multi-volume set intended to collect and present French translations of the best work from Europe's academies.

In 1764 he was elected a member of the Académie des Sciences, Arts et Belles-Lettres de Dijon.

At the request of the naturalist Georges-Louis Leclerc de Buffon, Guéneau became a contributor to the Histoire naturelle (1749-89), and specifically of the sub-series on birds, the Histoire naturelle des oiseaux (1770-83). Guéneau contributed anonymously to volumes 1 and 2 of the sub-series and under his own name to volumes 3 to 6.

The publisher Charles-Joseph Panckoucke enlisted Guéneau to write for the Encyclopédie méthodique (1782-1832), but Guéneau was unable to fulfill his commitment to write on insects and logic, metaphysics, and ethics.

== Works (selection) ==
- Histoire naturelle des oiseaux (Volume 6) - Buffon, Georges Louis Leclerc, comte de, 1707-1788 in collaboration with Guéneau de Montbeillard

== Bibliography ==
- E. C. Spary; Emma C. Spary: Utopia's Garden: French Natural History from Old Regime to Revolution. University of Chicago Press (2000) ISBN 0-226-76863-5
- G. Roth: Un ami de Diderot: Guéneau de Montbeillard. Mercure de France, January 1960, (p. 71–91)
