= Outline of Bábism =

Abrahamic monotheistic religion founded in 1844 by the Báb

Bábism is a monotheistic religion that was founded in 1844 in Qajar Persia by ʻAli Muhammad Shirazi (1819–1850), who took the title of the Báb (meaning "gate").

The following outline is provided as an overview of and topical guide to Bábism.

== History ==
=== Background ===
- Shaykhism – a Shi'a Islamic religious movement out of which Bábism emerged
  - Shaykh Ahmad – the founder of Shaykhism
  - Kazim Rashti – the leader of Shaykhism after the death of Shaykh Ahmad

=== Events ===
- Conference of Badasht – a meeting of leading followers of the Báb in 1848
- Battle of Fort Tabarsi – a seven-month battle between the Báb's followers and the Shah's army from 1848 to 1849
- Báb's trial in Tabriz – event in 1848
- Execution of the Báb – the execution of the Báb on July 9, 1850

=== Baháʼí/Bábí connection ===
Baháʼí–Azali split – the division of the Báb's followers into Baháʼís (who followed Baháʼu'lláh) and Azalis (who followed Subh-i-Azal)

- Baháʼí Faith – a religion founded by Baháʼu'lláh, who claimed to have fulfilled the Báb's prophecies of Him whom God shall make manifest, and which today has 5–8 million followers
- Azalis – the Bábís who followed Subh-i-Azal

=== Chroniclers ===
- Edward Granville Browne – a British Iranologist (1862–1926) who wrote extensively about Bábí history
- Nabíl-i-Aʻzam – a Bábí and then Baháʼí who wrote a chronicle of Bábí and Baháʼí history from a Baháʼí perspective, known as The Dawn-Breakers

== People ==
- Báb – the founder of Bábism
- Letters of the Living – the title given by the Báb to a group of his followers
  - Mulla Husayn – the first follower of the Báb when he made his religious claims in 1844
  - Mullá 'Alíy-i-Bastámí – a prominent follower of the Báb
  - Táhirih – an influential Bábí poet and theologian, who was born as Fátimih Baraghání and later became known as Táhirih ("the pure one")
  - Quddús – a prominent follower of the Báb
- Khadíjih-Bagum – the wife of the Báb
- Subh-i-Azal – the appointed successor of the Báb, who went on to lead the Azali Bábís
- Baháʼu'lláh – a prominent follower of the Báb who later founded the Baháʼí Faith, claiming to fulfill the Báb's prophecies of He whom God shall make manifest
- Dayyán – a prominent follower of the Báb

== Teachings ==
- Teachings of the Báb

== Texts written by the Báb ==
- Bayán – a term used both for the entire corpus of the Báb's writings and for two specific texts
  - Arabic Bayán
  - Persian Bayán
- Qayyūm al-asmā
- Dalá'il-i-Sab'ih
- Kitábu'l-Asmáʼ
- Selections from the Writings of the Báb – a compilation of excerpts from the Báb's writings published by the Universal House of Justice, the world governing body of the Baháʼí Faith

== Places ==
- Báb's house – the place where the Báb first made his religious claims, which was demolished in 1979
- Shrine of the Báb – the site of the Báb's remains, administered by the leadership of the Baháʼí Faith

== See also ==
- Outline of the Baháʼí Faith
- Outline of religion
