= Teachings of the Báb =

The teachings of the Báb refer to the teachings of Siyyid ʻAlí Muḥammad who was the founder of Bábísm, and one of three central figures of the Baháʼí Faith. He was a merchant from Shíráz, Persia, who at the age of twenty-four (on 23 May 1844) claimed to be the promised Qá'im (or Mahdi). After his declaration he took the title of Báb meaning "Gate". He composed hundreds of letters and books (often termed tablets) in which he stated his messianic claims and defined his teachings, which constituted a new sharí'ah or religious law. His movement eventually acquired tens of thousands of supporters, was virulently opposed by Iran's Shiʻa clergy, and was suppressed by the Iranian government leading to thousands of his followers, termed Bábís, being persecuted and killed. In 1850 the Báb was shot by a firing squad in Tabríz.

The teachings of the Báb can be grouped into three broad stages which each have a dominant thematic focus. His earliest teachings are primarily defined by his interpretation of the Qurʼan and other Islamic traditions. While this interpretive mode continues throughout all three stages of his teachings, a shift takes place where his emphasis moves to legislative pronouncements and to philosophical elucidation. In the philosophical stage, the Báb gives an explanation of the metaphysics of being and creation, and in the legislative stage his mystical and historical principles are explicitly united.

An analysis of the Báb's writings throughout the three stages shows that all of his teachings were animated by a common principle that had multiple dimensions and forms.

The writings of the Báb give new meanings to the notions of God, religion, and prophets, and interprets religious concepts such as heaven and hell and resurrection accordingly. Progressive revelation, continuity and renewal of religion, improving the status of women, abolishing priesthood, and emphasizing on human nobility are among some of the important teachings of the Báb. Yet another fundamental focus of his teachings is his emphasis on the advent of a messianic figure that he frequently refers to as "he whom God shall make manifest". The Báb always discusses his own revelation and laws in the context of this promised figure. Unlike previous religions that the reference to promised figures were only occasional and in hints and allusions, the main focus of Bayan, the mother book of the Bábí dispensation, is preparing the way for "he whom God shall make manifest".

== Three stages ==
=== Interpretation of the Qurʼan ===
In his earliest years the Báb focused on explanations and commentaries on verses of the Qurʼan, and on the teachings that represent "true Islam" "until the day of resurrection". During this time, while many Islamic injunctions remained in force in his writings, the Báb claimed that he had the authority to clarify issues relating to the details of Islamic Sharia. He used this genre against the grain of the established tradition, and he interpreted Islamic texts and traditions to transform, reverse and redefine the conventional meanings. For example, he tended to diverge from standard Muslim practices by making requirements stricter, such as enjoining additional prayers. Discussion of Shí'í millenarian themes were also an important part of the early works and gave his movement an apocalyptic edge; this was the day of the return of the Mahdi, of the victory and dominion of God. They gave the Bábí movement a widespread popular appeal.

His works frequently quoted and provided commentary on passages from the Qurʼan. Unlike classical Qurʼanic commentaries by theologians or Sufis, however, he usually commented on the meaning of the text letter by letter rather than the meanings of the words and sentences, allowing him to use a sacred text as a point of departure for revelation on a theme distantly related or even unrelated to the Qurʼanic passage. The Báb's overall approach to texts and many Islamic doctrines was symbolic and metaphorical, and he often rejected literal interpretations of apocalyptic doctrines. While he sometimes used Sufi terminology, his reasoning and approach are distinct from any other school of thought. The Báb taught that the realm of language, as well as all other aspects of phenomenal reality, including natural and cultural objects were symbolic of a deeper spiritual meaning. He taught that everything that exists in the world is a sign that proclaims the sovereignty of God. In this way, reality is a type of language that consists of words and letters that celebrate the divine revelation in all things.

According to Báb, his works reveal for the first time the hidden and esoteric truths of Islamic concepts and Quranic verses, facts which, in his opinion, are very different from the common belief among Muslims. According to the Báb, the day of resurrection is not the end of the world, it is rather the end of a stage of human evolution, that is, the end of the era of one religion and the beginning of the emergence of the next religion, which initiates a new stage of development of human history. So, the resurrection of Christianity occurred with the appearance of the prophet of Islam, and the resurrection of Islam occurred in 1844 with the appearance of the Báb.

According to the Báb, heaven and hell are not confined to human beings. All things have their own heavens and hells; both of which are states. Heaven, is state of the realization of the thing's potential and hell is the deprivation thereof. All things long reach their paradise; i.e. state of perfection and it is humanity's obligation to help everything, including nature, to achieve this goal.

For human beings, heaven is the state in which one realizes their spiritual potentialities and hell is the state of in which one is deprived of such realization. As human beings are historical beings and there is no limit to how much they can advance spiritually, heaven and hell too are historical and dynamic phenomena.

=== Legislative pronouncements ===
The Báb's early doctrines started to change in 1848 when he abrogated Islamic shari'ah law. The Bábí shari'ah included its own form of pilgrimage to the Báb's house in Shiraz. A Bábí calendar of nineteen months of nineteen days was defined that started on Persian Naw-Ruz and included a four-day intercalary period (to raise the total days to 365, 19 times 19 being only 361). The last 19-day month, falling in March, was the Bábí month of fasting. Bábí obligatory prayer was different from Muslim practice as well, but was deemphasized compared to dhikr, repetition of various scriptural verses. Laws regulating marriage discouraged polygamy, forbade concubinage, and instituted a year of waiting before a divorce could be completed. Such laws, as well as the removal of any explicit need for women to veil themselves and the fact that the penalty for causing grief to women is double that of causing grief to men in the Bayán (Persian Bayān 7:18) potentially improved the status of women to a considerable degree. The Báb taught that, since God transcends the boundaries of male and female, God wishes that "neither men exalt themselves over women, nor women exalt themselves over men" and instructed his followers to not mistreat women "even for the blink of an eye". He also encouraged the education of women and didn't display a gender distinction in Bábí laws on education. Armin Eschraghi notes the context of 19th century Iran and that, "Modern western readers might not appreciate the revolutionary potential" of the Báb's teaching that "Those who have been brought up in this community, men and women, are allowed to look [at each other], speak and sit together" The Primal Will of God is also personified as the female figure of the maid of heaven.

The Báb also foreshadowed later developments in media, by emphasising the need for a rapid system of news communication, which would be available for all to access, no matter their wealth or social standing. He writes, regarding the news, that "until such a system is made universal, its benefit will not reach those servants of the kingdom unless there come a time when it will be accessible to all the people. Although today the kings have their own special couriers, this is fruitless, for the poor are deprived of such a service." Commenting on the extremes of wealth and poverty in society, the Báb also teaches that the true station of the rich should be as "the depositories of God" and enjoins generosity and charity. He says, "Should ye find one stricken with poverty, enrich him to the extent of your ability...should ye find one who is in distress, bring him tranquility by any means in your power"

The themes of jihad and martyrdom also remained important in the Báb's writings. The Báb often wrote theoretically about jihad in the sense of armed struggle, but he never explicitly announced the beginning of a jihad, and he completely undermines the concept of jihad by defining holy war in a way as to make it contingent on impossible conditions, thus nullifying it. The various Bábí struggles appear to have primarily involved defensive jihad. Martyrdom, an immensely important theme in Shí'ism, was important to Bábís as well, with the siege of the Bábí fort at Shaykh Tabarsí being viewed as a Bábí recapitulation of the events of Karbila. Hundreds of individual Bábís were martyred in public, usually in ways that inspired admiration or even allegiance to their cause.

Several of the Báb's writings following his return to Chiriq in August 1848 to his execution in July 1850, such as the Kitáb-i-Asmáʼ, discussed ritual practices largely unrelated to the actual circumstances of the Bábí community. The Báb's writings also contained many codified chronograms, cabalistic interpretations, talismanic figures, astrological tables, and numerical calculations, some of which appear to be similar to the Nuqtavi cabalistic symbolism. The number 19 appears in many parts of the Báb's writings, which also resembles Nuqtavi documents. While some elements found in the Nuqtavi school are confirmed in the writings of the Báb, the literal emphasis that the Nuqtavi school placed on letters as direct elements of divine creation are foreign to the Báb's teachings; his teachings have little to do with the issue of the actual letters or their literal divine character, but instead, concern a mystical world view where the sacred character of human beings is the image of God.

The Báb also developed legal principles that were intended to be implemented in a theocratic Bábí state if He whom God shall make manifest approved and implemented them. The rules of this state included the burning of non-Bábí books and the banning of non-Bábís from residence within its boundaries.

Jack McLean, summarising Nader Saiedi's analysis, writes that the Báb's writings "foresee current global issues of crisis, such as the protection of the environment and the commodification of natural resources". The Báb specifically calls for the absolute purity of water (Bayán 6:2) and as all substances return to the inland water table and the oceans, this could easily be interpreted as a general law for the protection of the environment. The Arabic Bayán (9:11) also forbids the commodification of the four elements, earth, air, fire and water.

=== Philosophical elucidation ===
In his later writings the Báb described the divine or eternal essence to be unknowable, indescribable and inaccessible. The Báb compared the divine to the sun which remains single, although it appears under different names and forms in the persons, prophets, whom it is in manifested in. Some of these teachings exhibit features common to earlier Shiite sects such as the Ismailis and the Hurufis. However, his teaching on the need for successive "prophetic cycles" is completely an original conception. He also reinterpreted Shí'í eschatological terms, such as "resurrection", "Judgment Day", and "paradise" and "hell". He stated that "Resurrection" means the appearance of a new revelation, and that "raising of the dead" refers to the spiritual awakening of those who have stepped away from true religion. He further stated that "Judgment Day" alludes to the time a new Manifestation of God comes, and his acceptance or rejection by the Earth's inhabitants. Thus the Báb taught that with his revelation the end times had come and the age of resurrection had started, and that the end-times were symbolic as the end of the past prophetic cycle. Traditional Shí'í millenarian beliefs were reinterpreted so radically that few of the popular traditional expectations were left. Another constant theme in his works, especially in the Persian Bayán, is that of He whom God shall make manifest: a messianic figure who would come after him. Bábís were exhorted to leave a chair for him at all gatherings and constantly to be prepared to accept him.

The Báb also developed a distinct philosophy of Aesthetics, which emphasised Beauty and Refinement as governing principles, not only for Art but for our actions, and stressed the need to bring all things to their highest state of perfection, or paradise. Saiedi writes that, "The Báb makes it clear that He wants His community to be the embodiment of perfection in all things. Furthermore, He defines beautification and excellence in art as the means of the spiritualization of the world". The Báb himself writes, using calligraphy as an example of a universal principle, "Should he know of a higher degree of refinement and fail to manifest it upon that paper, he would deprive it of its paradise, and he would be held accountable, for why hast thou, despite the possession of the means, withheld the effusion of grace and favour?" Moojan Momen writes, regarding the word refinement, that The Báb "seems to have regarded this word as signifying the closest that physical reality can come to spiritual reality. As physical reality ascends and becomes closer to spiritual reality, it loses its qualities of thickness, denseness and impurity...and acquires the qualities of delicacy, purity and refinement".

== Some key teachings ==
=== God and prophets ===
The Báb emphasizes on the absolute transcendence of God and rejects any anthropomorphic conception of him. The Báb states that God is unknowable, indescribable, inaccessible to the world, but he reveals himself through prophets to humanity out of his love for them. This teaching of the Báb continue as a key principle of the Bahá'í Faith. (see God in the Baháʼí Faith). It is through their recognition that God can be known and they are the supreme manifestations of God in the world. According to the writings of the Báb there is a unity among prophets of God. They resemble pure mirrors, that while being diverse, reflect the same sun (a metaphor for the one God) in themselves. The writings of the Báb emphasize that there is no end to the revelation of God, and new religions and prophets will appear forever throughout history.

=== Progressive revelation ===
One of the most fundamental teachings of the Báb is the continuity and evolution of religion. God gradually manifests himself to humanity through his prophets; and as humanity advances throughout history, divine teachings become more progressive and comprehensive. Each religion appears in response to the social needs of humanity at the time of its advent. It is more advanced compared to its predecessors, but its potential perfection is realized through the emergence of the next religion. According to this logic, no religion is the final religion.

Resurrection then according to the Báb is not the end of world, but the decline of the old religion and its revival in the form of a new revelation. The Báb uses the metaphor of seasons to further explains this cyclical progression. "the tree of prophethood" blossoms in the spring, gains strength in the summer, and reaches fruition in the fall, and finally dies in the winter. The tree however is reborn and revived in the following spring. The tree changes and grows over time yet it is the same tree throughout. This concept of prophetic renewal carries a sense of historical relativism in it and acknowledges historical change. It calls implicitly for human agency rather than prophetic finality and promotes a forward-looking perspective. The Báb thus promotes an indigenous notion of modernity which relies on historical progression rather than the sanctity of the past.

According to the Báb, religion is a dialogical and relative phenomenon that is the product of the interaction of the will of God with the historical stage of the development of humanity. The Báb rejects the traditional concept of religion which portrays it as an absolute and eternally binding imposition of the will of God on humans. Religion is a dynamic and progressive reality similar to humanity. One of the most significant and central expressions of this dialectical and historical concept is the Báb's use of the term irtifá (Persian: ارتفاع) which carries two contradictory meaning; cancellation and elevation. Irtifá‘ conveys the same semantics as Hegel’s Aufhebung (to elevate/abolish). According to the Báb, each new religion is an irtifá‘ of the previous religion. The new religion is the negation and abrogation of the previous religion, yet at the same it is the same previous religion, which appears in a higher, more elevated form.

This notion of continuity and renewal anticipates future prophetic revelations after the Báb. More specifically the Báb states that the essence and purpose of his own mission, as he always stresses, is to prepare the people for the advent of a yet greater messianic figure that appears after him which he refers to as "he whom God shall make manifest".

According to the Báb, the word of God is alive and dynamic and wants to appear in its new form in conjunction with the evolution of mankind. He deeply regrets that religious traditionalists, out of their love for their divine book, prevent the evolution of the same book and reject its re-appearance in the next religious dispensation.

=== Expectation of the promised one ===
Unlike earlier religions in which references to future promised figures were occasional and only in hints and allusions, the entirety of the Bayan, the mother book of the Bábí dispensation, is essentially a discourse on a messianic figure, even greater than himself, that the Báb refers to as "he Whom God shall make manifest". The Báb always discusses his own revelation and laws in the context of this promised figure. The essence and purpose of the Báb's own mission, as he always stressed, was to prepare the people for the advent of him. The Báb describes this messianic figure as the origin of all divine attributes, and states that his command is equivalent to God's command. He asks his followers to independently investigate and look for the promised one, and recognize him out of his own intrinsic reality, works and attributes, and not due to any reasons external to him. He even warns them not to be deprived of the promised one by arguing against him from the works of the Báb, the same way the followers of the previous religions opposed the next prophet while citing their holy scriptures.

Furthermore, the Báb speaks of the imminence of the advent of the promised one and refers to the time of his advent as year nine and nineteen. In 1863, nineteen years after the Báb declared his mission, Baha'u'llah, in the company of his companions in Iraq, and later in 1866 in Edirne, in a more publicized manner, claimed to be the figure promised by the Báb. Most of the Bábí community accepted him and later became known as Baha'is.

=== Human nobility ===
The Báb sees humans as noble beings who are endowed with the inherent capacity to think for themselves and, therefore, are obligated to engage in the independent investigation of truth. This means that no human being should be dependent on others to investigate the spiritual truth. Two major expressions of this idea are the Báb's abolishment of priesthood and his emphasis on the words of revelation, not miracles, as the valid evidence of the legitimacy of the claims of a prophet.

The writings of the Báb eliminated the institution of clergy and prohibited anyone from mounting the pulpit. He finds such ascent, as well as the seating of the people beneath a cleric, as an insult to the dignity of all human beings. He also prohibits congregational prayer, which requires following a clerical leader of the prayer. According to the Báb, the worship of God does not require human mediation. Even when the Báb makes an exception in the case of the congregational prayer for the dead, He emphasizes that no one should stand ahead of others. All must stand in equal rows to honor the deceased.

According to the Báb, one of the main reasons for the corruption of religions in general is the clergy. The Báb also criticizes the practice of confessing sins to priests.

One of the central teachings of the Báb is that miracles, as the breaking of the laws of nature, has nothing to do with the mission of prophets, which is the spiritual and moral education of humanity. Therefore, miracles cannot prove the truth of prophethood. The Báb rejects Shia's obsessive preoccupation with miracles to foster rationalism, and remove superstition from religion. According to the Báb there is only one valid evidence for the legitimacy of a prophet, and that is the creative words of the prophet which address the needs of the time and bring a new culture, value system, and meaning to the lives of the people, transforms them and help them reach human perfection.

=== Improving the status of women ===
Most contemporary accounts agree that one of the main social impacts of the Bábí movement was the improvement of the status of women. The Báb generally treats women and men equally in his laws. He specifically alleviates some of the burdens that Islamic law had laid upon women; e.g. by adding a twelve-month delay to divorce, he makes it more difficult, he discourages polygamy, and forbids concubinage, forced marriage, men having intercourse with their wife without her permission, and men unilaterally divorcing their wives. He relaxes severe restrictions on women’s social intercourse, and orders men not to harm women. He orders men to treat women with the utmost love. On occasions, the Báb even gives women preference over men; for example, he sets a penalty for anyone who causes grief to another person, which he equates to causing grief to God, but he says that the penalty for causing grief to women is doubled.

The Báb teaches that, since God transcends the boundaries of male and female, God wishes that "neither men exalt themselves over women, nor women exalt themselves over men".

In one of his early works, the Báb states that everybody should treat women in "the best way of kindness", and wrote that harassing women, even to the extent of blinking an eye, is a violation of God's command.

The Báb encouraged the education of women and did not display a gender distinction in Bábí laws on education.

In addition to his writings, the Báb also showed that his religion wants to improve the situation of women by supporting his leading female disciple Tahereh. The Báb always praised Tahereh and approved of her activities that included her removing her hijab, advancing the claims of the Báb, and breaking the Bábí faith from Islam, even when some Bábís complained about them or opposed them. Shortly after the conference Badasht gathering, in which Tahereh played a central role, the Báb praised her in one of his writings and equated her to the totality of the remaining seventeen letters of the living. The letters of the living, which Tahereh is one of, are the first eighteen individuals who believed in the Báb, and for this reason, have the highest spiritual station in the dispensation of the Báb among his followers.

The teachings of the Báb on improving the status of women represented a significant departure from legal norms and social customs that were prevalent in parts of the Muslim world that have lingered even to the present day. Armin Eschraghi notes the context of 19th century Iran and that, "Modern western readers might not appreciate the revolutionary potential" of the teachings of Báb.

The Primal Will of God is personified as the female figure of the maid of heaven in the writings of the Bab.

=== Importance of education ===
The Báb emphasized rationality, science, and efficient education. Education has to be well organized and knowledge conveyed to children in a systematic way. According to the Báb, a progressive society is based on an efficient pedagogical approach, with well-organized schools. There are some key themes that must be thought about in the schools: ethical issues such as the importance of respect for other opinions and ideas; the relativity of spirituality; the methodology required to be free from past superstitions; the nobility of the role of humankind in the world civilization; and the promotion of respect and valuing the role of the women in the society. The Báb also considered natural sciences important, including biology, physics, and chemistry, as well as medicine. He proposed radical reform in the sphere of education. He recommended modernizing it by eliminating all obsolete themes such as Islamic law and religious logic. Moreover, he wanted to eliminate the use of complicated words and to make the language easier and less complicated.

The Báb encourages believers to be proactive in order to learn the sciences. In such a context, the Bāb recommended that teachers be attentive in their teaching methodology, recommending them to use kindness, patience, and particularly fantasy. The use of the game is fundamental in order to improve the learning process, The Báb says. He also recommended that teachers not use corporal punishment toward children. For this reason, The Bab devotes a part of his reflection on education to dissuading teachers from using violence toward the children. He recommended that teachers be very careful in their communication, as children’s souls are very delicate and they can easily be hurt in their childhood, and this might influence their behavior in society in the future. The Bāb thus promotes discipline in schools but forbids the use of violence. He clearly states in the Arabic part of Bayan: “Do not hit anyone, not ever.” At the same time, The Bab recommends that children and pupils should be respectful of their teachers, who are very important in society. It is the teachers who teach the children how to read and write and for this reason they have an enormous role in the process of civilization. Moreover, the Bāb recommends that parents should educate their children with attention, teaching them kindness. According to the Bāb, the main purpose of civilization is peaceful cohabitation, and this can be reached only through the use of kindness and the spread of gentle manners in society.

=== Ethics ===
The bulk of Persian Bayan elaborates on the basic ethical principle that, even if people wrong you, you must forgive them, do good to them, and behave toward them as God would when he gives grace to those who ungratefully repudiate Him. In short, they call for an inner spiritual transformation. One must be content with God, with the laws of God, with one's parents, and with oneself. The Báb calls for perfection and refinement in a variety of senses: in keeping rivers pure and unpolluted; in preserving the environment and not damaging the nature as it is the mirror of God; in producing crafts and goods of the highest quality; in building beautiful dwellings with doors high enough for even the tallest person to enter; in the creation of beautiful art; in bathing regularly; in wearing clean and spotless clothing; and in the spread of prosperity to all. He forbade causing grief and sadness to anyone and said this was "doubly binding" in the treatment of women, implying a new status of women in society. He also forbade the physical punishment and humiliation of children. The Báb saw all of these actions as expressions of the beauty and virtue of God in one's life and as forms of worship. He sought to spiritualize one's understanding of the world, including a symbolic description of time itself through the introduction of a calendar of nineteen months, each with nineteen days, with the days and months named after attributes of God. In short, the Báb sought to create an entirely new sort of community, one focused on unity, love, and service to others and one where there would be no role for violence, except perhaps occasionally in the restraint of criminals. According to the Báb, the main purpose of civilization is peaceful coexistence, and this can be reached only through the use of kindness and the spread of gentle manners in society.

Jack McLean, summarizing Nader Saiedi's analysis, writes that the Báb's writings "foresee current global issues of crisis, such as the protection of the environment and the commodification of natural resources". The Báb specifically calls for the absolute purity of water in the Bayán and as all substances return to the inland water table and the oceans, this could easily be seen as a general law for the protection of the environment. The Arabic Bayán also forbids the commodification of the four elements, earth, air, fire and water.

The Báb also foreshadowed later developments in media, by emphasizing the need for a rapid system of news communication, which would be available for all to access, no matter their wealth or social standing. He writes, regarding the news, that "until such a system is made universal, its benefit will not reach those servants of the kingdom unless there come a time when it will be accessible to all the people. Although today the kings have their own special couriers, this is fruitless, for the poor are deprived of such a service."

=== Aesthetics and spiritual refinement ===
The Báb also developed a distinct philosophy of aesthetics, which emphasized beauty and refinement (litafat) as governing principles, not only for art but for our actions, and stressed the need to bring all things to their highest state of perfection, or paradise (itqan). Saiedi writes that, "The Bab makes it clear that He wants His community to be the embodiment of perfection in all things. Furthermore, He defines beautification and excellence in art as the means of the spiritualization of the world." The Báb writes, using calligraphy as an example of a universal principle, "Should he know of a higher degree of refinement and fail to manifest it upon that paper, he would deprive it of its paradise, and he would be held accountable, for why hast thou, despite the possession of the means, withheld the effusion of grace and favor?"
