= A. L. M. Nicolas =

French historian, translator and writer

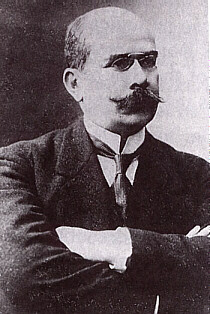
- Born: Louis Alphonse Daniel Nicolas; 27 March 1864; Rasht, Gilan province, Persia (present-day Iran)
- Died: 28 February 1939 (aged 74)
- Occupations: Interpreter, diplomat, historian
- Father: Louis Jean Baptiste Nicolas

Louis Alphonse Daniel Nicolas (1864–1939)—better known by his pen name A. L. M. Nicolas—was a Persian-born French historian and scholar of Oriental studies who is best known today for his early work on Shaykhism and Bábism. Although primarily remembered for his academic contributions, Nicolas worked as an interpreter and diplomat with the French Consular Service in Persia for most of his life. Nicolas was among the first Western orientalist to devote substantial attention to the life and teachings of the revolutionary Persian religious figure known as the Báb, and his work continues to serve as an important source for the study of the early history of Shaykhism, Bábism and the Baháʼí Faith.

== Biography ==
Nicolas was born on 27 March 1864, in Rasht, in the Gilan province of Iran where his father was stationed with the French Consular Service in Persia. As a young man he learned to speak French, Persian and Russian, going on to study at the Special School for Oriental Languages in Paris. After his studies, Nicolas followed his father's footsteps, joining the consular services in which he served as leading Persian interpreter.

An ongoing disagreement between Nicolas's father and Arthur de Gobineau—secretary and chargé d’affarires at the French legation in Persia, who would go on to be an influential orientalist—led Nicolas to read Gobineau's book Les Religions et Les Philosophies dan l'Asie Centrale. While Nicolas agreed with his father's assessment of Gobineau's work as riddled with errors resulting from Gobineau's limited grasp of Persian and lack of research acumen, it was through this work that he was first exposed to the life and teachings of the Báb. As a result of his research, Nicolas befriended an employee of the consulate who was a member of the Baháʼí Faith, and who assisted him to meet local Bábís and Baháʼís.

As Nicolas continued studying, his interest did not remain purely academic. He developed friendships with local members of the two religions, and undertook to translate a selection of Bábí scriptures. Over the course of translating the Báb's Persian Bayán and Dalá'il-i-Sab'ih (The Seven Proofs) from Persian to French, he developed a growing appreciation for the teachings and person of the Báb, came to identify as a follower of the Báb, or a Bábí. In a 1939 interview, he described this experience:

"I had resolved to translate the "Persian Bayán". I admit that during the two or three years of my study [of that book] I was often dazzled by the explanations that the Báb gives us for certain mysteries such as death, the resurrection, the Sirát – this bridge that passes over hell, narrow as a hair, sharp as a razor, and which the believer traverses with the rapidity of lightning. These explanations pleased me and I exerted myself more and more in my work. I only regret having neglected the translation of the majority of the Writings that issued forth from the pen of the Prophet.

"Also, in reading the "Book of the Seven Proofs", which I translated, I was seduced by the clarity of reasoning of the Báb. I was aided in my work by a young Persian and every day in the afternoon we went walking outside the town leaving through the gate of Shimran. The purity of the air, the serenity, the softness of the temperature and, in certain seasons, the perfume of the acacias predisposed my soul to peace and to tenderness. The meditations that I had upon the strange book I was translating filled me with a kind of intoxication and I became bit by bit profoundly and uniquely a Bábí. The more I plunged into these meditations the more I admired the exalted genius of the one who, born in Shíráz, dreamed of uplifting the Muslim world; and [his] explanation of the meaning of the language of Shí'í belief impelled me gradually to write "Seyyed Ali Mohammed dit le Báb".

— A. L. M. Nicolas, 1939 Interview by Edith Sanderson
