= Báb's trial in Tabriz =

The Báb's trial in Tabríz took place in 1848.

== Background ==
The Báb was put on trial in summer 1848 in the city of Tabriz. There, he was interrogated by the local Islamic clergy in the presence of Naser al-Din Shah Qajar, who was then the crown prince.

== Alleged recantation ==
According to one account, after the Báb's bastinado, he recanted his claims and provided a "sealed undertaking" that he would not repeat his errors.

=== Documentation ===
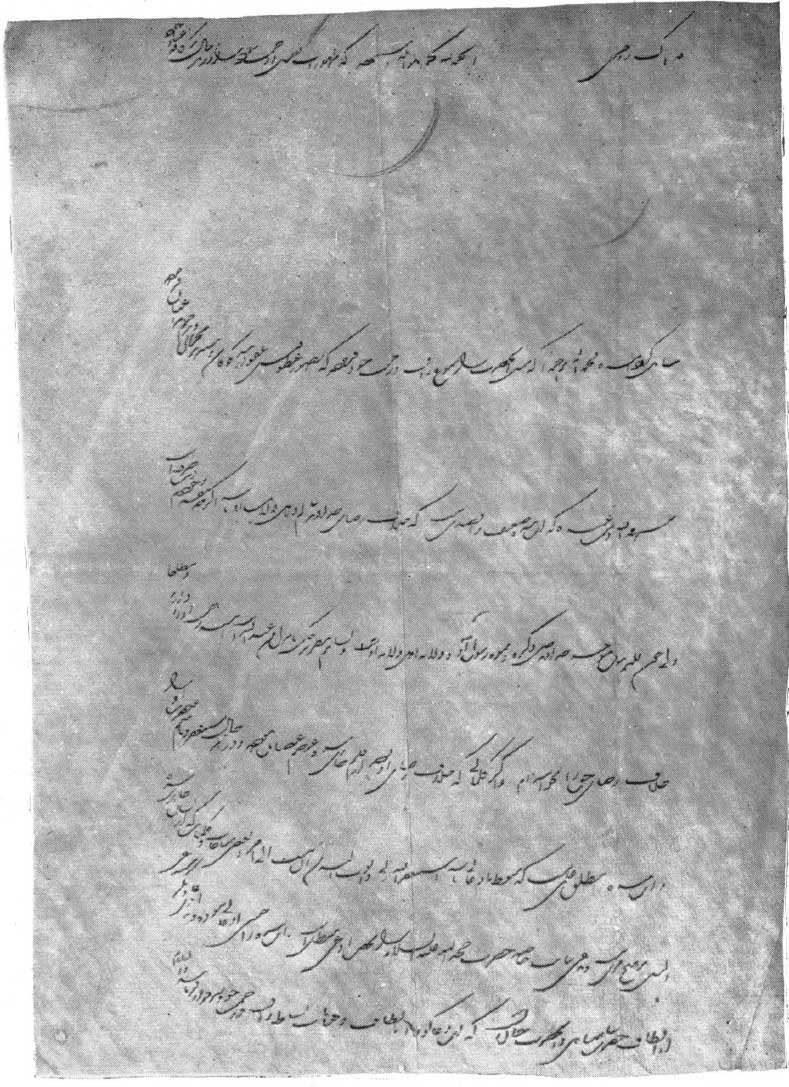
Facsimile of Document B as reproduced in Edward Browne's book Materials for the Study of the Bābī Religion (1918)

British Edward Granville Browne included in his book Materials for the Study of the Bābī Religion (1918) two documents that he had received from Hippolyte Dreyfus in February 1912. Dreyfus, a French Baháʼí and a disciple of 'Abdu'l-Bahá, had written to Browne that he was unsure about their authenticity, asking him to examine them.

The first document, a handwriting (Document A) purportedly by Amīr Aṣlān Khán, who headed the interrogation of the Bab in Tabriz, reports directly to the Shah that the Bab has repented. The second handwriting (Document B), seemingly written by the Báb, is a recantation; however, there is no indication that it is the same one mentioned in Document A. Browne describes the handwriting "graceful" but "not easily legible" without personally commenting on its authenticity.

As per Sayyid Mahdī Golpáygánī, the authentic copies of the papers replicated by Browne were found in the Iranian state archives following the deposition of Mohammad Ali Shah Qajar in 1909, then subsequently photographed. These records are currently archived in the Library of the Iranian Parliament.

==== Scholarly views on authenticity ====
Many consider the recantation letter (Document B) to be a forgery because it lacks a seal and signature, has no identified recipient, and bears no date. Historian Abbas Amanat argues that the style of the letter does not match the Báb's writing and was likely fabricated by Tabriz officials to discredit him and please the Shah. Amanat further states that despite intense pressure on the Báb to recant and suppress the Bábí movement, he refused and remained steadfast in his beliefs until the end. Consequently, he was publicly executed by firing squad in the barracks square of Tabriz to both silence the Bábí movement and demonstrate the power of the newly appointed Qajar minister. Amanat concludes that, at best, the document may have been prepared by government officials in Tabriz, but the Báb refused to sign it. Furthermore, Amanat describe the document as "part and parcen of all anti-Bábi-Baháʼí polemics and an effective weapon in the growing arsenal of fictitious documentation."

E. Denison Ross also believed that the trial of the Báb in Tabriz was convened in the hope of obtaining his repentance, but since he refused, and thus his death sentence was issued. John Walbridge too notes that the Báb was subjected to great pressure to repent and deny his claims and writings. Instead, the Báb openly declared his claim to be the Qá'im during his trial in Tabriz and, despite the pressure of the clerics, refused to recant.

The Báb's opponents, including Mirza Mehdi Khan Za’im al-Dawlah, the son of Mulla Muhammad-i-Mamaqani, and Karim Khan Kirmani, despite their opposition to him, all acknowledged that he did not recant.

Mirza Mehdi Khan Za’im al-Dawlah, whose father and grandfather were both present at the Báb's trial, wrote in his work Miftah Bab al-Abwab—a polemic against the Báb and Bahá’u’lláh—that despite efforts to persuade the Báb to repent and express regret for his claims, he refused, and when this became clear, the order for his execution was issued. He further noted that his father pleaded with the Báb, whose death sentence had been issued, to withdraw his claim so that his life might be spared, “but he did not heed my father’s words and remained calm and silent”.

Similarly, the son of Mulla Muhammad-i-Mamaqani emphasized that despite his father's insistence, the Báb did not repent. Mulla Muhammad-i-Mamaqani was among those who issued the Báb's death sentence.

Karim Khan Kirmani, author of Irshad al-‘Awam and a prominent opponent of the Báb who led a faction of the Shaykhi movement that did not accept him, expressed joy upon hearing of the Báb’s execution, writing that the Báb was "made a target of bullets after being ordered to repent of his unbelief but refusing to do so."

On the other hand, MacEoin argues that the authenticity of the document may rest on similarities in handwriting and its denial of specific viceregency claims the Báb had previously rejected.

=== Polemics and apologetics ===
According to Amanat, Document B is "part and parcel of all anti-Bábi-Baháʼí polemics and an effective weapon in the growing arsenal of fictitious documentation." MacEoin disagrees that the fact is relevant to the authenticity.

A lengthy Baháʼí work titled Bayán al-haqáʻyíq is devoted to refutation of the authenticity of Document B.

Bábi sources maintain that the Báb practiced taqiyya in 1845 to keep himself safe and despite his "confession," esoterically remained faithful to his ideas. In fact, he did not deny that he was the Qāʾim himself.

Early Bábi/Baháʼí sources vary from others in narrating the events of the 1848 trial. The Apologia contends that during the trial, the Báb displayed unwavering confidence and effectively outsmarted the clerical interrogators. These sources dispute the notion that the Báb received a formal education and emphasize the divine source of his knowledge. Regardless of the perspective towards the Báb, all reports suggest that the clergy focused on highlighting two aspects: the Báb's perceived limited knowledge and his purported inability to perform miracles. According to Mangol Bayat, historical accounts suggest that both the accusations and the assertion that the Bab performed poorly in the tests were well-founded.

Commenting on reports of Báb's recantation in Shiraz, Hamid Algar states that although the accuracy of such accounts may be debated, the lack of Bábí sources describing the events suggests that the Báb was likely worsted by the ulama in debate. On the other hand, Amanat and MacEoin believe questions posed to the Báb by the clerics in Tabriz were largely inquisitorial and unfair, focusing on demands for miracles and linguistic traps intended to discredit him rather than to sincerely examine his claims.
