= Selections from the Writings of the Báb =

Bahá'í compilation of texts by the Báb, published in 1976

- Author: Research Department of the Universal House of Justice
- Translator: Habib Taherzadeh
- Language: English
- Genre: Anthology
- Publisher: Baháʼí Publishing Trust
- Publication date: 1976
- Pages: 223
- ISBN: 978-0853980667

Selections from the Writings of the Báb is an anthology in English that features translated works of the Báb, the founder of Bábism and the forerunner-Prophet of the Baháʼí Faith. It was compiled and published in 1976 by the Universal House of Justice.

== Composition ==
This book is primarily based on a similar Persian book published in Tehran with the title Montaḵabāt-e āyāt az āṯār-e Hażrat-e Noqṭa-ye Ūlā, although the English translation was published a year earlier than the Persian version. The Báb's writings were reviewed by the Research Department of the Universal House of Justice, and the selected passages were translated by Habib Taherzadeh, with the assistance of a translating committee.

Denis MacEoin describes the book as a "heavily edited selection of passages". According to the scholar, the editorial stance of the Baháʼí administration in selecting the content of the book was intended to present a "tendentious" and "partisan viewpoint" regarding the Báb, specifically his precursor role in relation to Baháʼu'lláh, rather than accurately representing his teachings and wider thought.

== Content ==
The book contains excerpts from four of Báb's works, including Qayyūm al-asmā, Persian Bayán, Dalá'il-i-Sab'ih and Kitábu'l-Asmáʼ. Not any of the sections deal with legal prescriptions. MacEoin argues that this can be explained by the evident reluctance of the Baháʼís to publish the complete texts of the Báb's works, as instructed by ʻAbdu'l-Bahá. The Baháʼí perspective is that the laws of Bábism have been abrogated, superseded, and canceled in favor of their own. As a result, they refrain from preaching Bayán.

== Reception ==
Denis MacEoin, in his book The Sources for Early Bābī Doctrine and History, mentions several points that he deems as flaws in the book, writing "lack of an introduction, the virtual absence of notes, and the failure to indicate identity, provenance, condition, and location of manuscripts used or the reasons for their choice... no indication as to whether a given passage was translated on the basis of one or more manuscripts; and, in several cases, the original is only vaguely identified as a prayer or tablet".
