= Dayyán =

The great Dayyan (Arabic: میرزا أسد الله), often referred to as Dayyán, was a Bábí follower, a religion founded by the Báb in Persia in 1844. The Báb wrote numerous tablets of praise to Dayyán recognising his devotion to the new religion. In the days before his execution, the Báb asked that Dayyán be the custodian of his work, keeping his writings safe.

Among the Bábí teachings was the appearance of a messianic figure, termed He whom God shall make manifest. After the Báb's death, Dayyán was the third person to recognize "He whom God shall make manifest", in the person of Baháʼu'lláh. Dayyán was murdered for refuting the claims of successor-ship made by Mirza Yahya.

Miller, an American missionary to Persia, wrote that Baha was not the only one who at this time was prepared to make a claim for himself, for a man named Mirza Asadullah-i-Khuy surnamed Dayyán, who had been appointed by the Báb as amanuensis to Subh-i-Azal, declared that he was He whom God shall make manifest, and demanded that all the Babis obey him, and some of them became his followers. Miller adds that Subh-i-Azal denounced Dayyán in a book he wrote, but as Dayyan remained obstinate, he was murdered by Mirza Muhammad of Mazanderan, probably by drowning him in the Tigris.

The Báb gave Mírza Asadu'lláh the surname "Dayyán" ("One Who Rewards" or "Judge"). Shoghi Effendi describes him as "the zealous, the famous Mírza Asadu'lláh, surnamed Dayyán, a prominent official of high literary repute, who was endowed by the Báb with the "hidden and preserved knowledge," and extolled as the "repository of the trust of the one true God..." The Báb predicted Dayyán would be the third person to believe in Baháʼu'lláh and extolled him as the "Third Letter to believe in Him Whom God shall make manifest." When Baháʼu'lláh was in Kurdistan, Dayyán wrote to and received responses from Mírza Yahyá that he considered inadequate and devoid of spiritual knowledge. Baháʼu'lláh wrote in the Kitáb-i-Badíʻ that after reading prayers by Dayyán which showed a loyalty to God's Messengers and emphasized humility and servitude, Mírza Yahyá became very jealous and "determined to harm him". Tensions increased when Dayyán wrote a letter refuting Mírza Yahyá's claim to be the Báb's successor, even quoting the Báb to make his point. Mírza Yahyá responded by writing a book Mustayqiz (Sleeper Awakened) which reprimanded Dayyán, called him the "Father of Calamities," and called on Bábís to kill him. Mírza Yahyá gave this order in 1856. He sent Mírza Muhammad-i-Mázindarání to Azerbaijan "with explicit orders to kill Dayyán." In the meantime Dayyán left Azerbaijan before Mírza Muhammad arrived. Dayyán was on his way to Baghdad to attain the presence of Baháʼu'lláh Who happened to be returning to Baghdad from Sulaymaniyah in Kurdistan. Dayyán did attain His presence and, on so doing, renounced all prior claims to leadership. Subsequently, Mírza Muhammad did find Dayyán and eventually had Dayyán accompany him on a trip to Baghdad. It was on this trip that Dayyán lost his life to Mírza Muhammad.

On the other hand, followers of Subh-i-Azal believe that Dayyán had declared himself to be He whom God shall make manifest and that Baháʼu'lláh, after a protracted discussion with him, instructed his servant Mirza Muhammad Ali of Mázandarán to slay him, which was accordingly done.
