= Bayán =

Scripture in Bábism, written by the Báb around 1848

In Bábism, Bayán (Arabic: بیان), or exposition, denotes the whole body of the works of the Báb. It also refers more specifically to a set of two books written by the Báb around 1848:

- Persian Bayán, written in Persian
- Arabic Bayán, written in Arabic

Some modern Bábís (followers of the Báb) call themselves 'Bayaní' after this title of the Báb's writings. Baháʼís also see the Bayán as holy, since they consider their founder, Baháʼu'lláh, to be the fulfillment of the Báb's main prophecy.
