= Khadíjih-Sultán =

Iranian religious figure (1820–1882)

Khadíjih Bagum خدیجە بگیم
- Title: In the Kitáb-i-Badí, Bahá'u'lláh calls her the title of Khayru'n Nisa (The Most Virtuous of Women).

Personal life
- Born: K͟hadíjih-Sultán Shírází; 1820 Shiraz, Iran
- Died: 15 September 1882 Shiraz, Iran
- Cause of death: Unknown disease.
- Resting place: Buried in Shiraz in the Shah Chiragh
- Partner: the Báb (1842–1850)
- Children: Ahmad (1843–1843)
- Parents: Siyyid Mírzá `Alí (father); Hájíyyih Bíbí Fátimih (mother)
- Known for: First disciple, scribe, religious figure
- Occupation: Scribe, religious figure
- Relatives: Afnán

Religious life
- Religion: Bábism, Baháʼí

Khadíjih Bagum (1820–1882) was the primary witness to the Báb's early spiritual life and his first declarations of his mission; she was the partner of the Báb, She left behind detailed, first-hand oral and written recollections of her life with the Báb. Khadíjih-Sultán's memoirs prove she was actually the very first person to believe in him. He confided his mission to her privately before anyone else.

Throughout Bahá'í literature she is sometimes referred to as Khadíjih-Sultán Bagum, Khadíjih Bigum or Khadíjih Khánum. Her father, an active merchant, was named Siyyid Mírzá `Alí and her mother, Hájíyyih Bíbí Fátimih, was the daughter of Hájí Muhammad-Muhsin, a prominent merchant from a respected trading family in Shiraz and Bushihr, Persia. She was the Báb's second cousin, a niece of the Báb's mother's father and playmate during their childhood.

She had two brothers, Hájí Mírzá Abú'l-Qásim and Hají Mírzá Siyyid Hasan - and two sisters; her full sister, Zahrá-Sultán, was the mother of Áqá Mírzá Áqá, a devoted supporter of Khadíjih Bagum who dedicated his life to her service, and her half-sister, Khadíjih-Sultán's maternal half-sister, was ʻAmmih Ḥájí, played a highly prominent role in early Bábi history through her lineage and marriage.

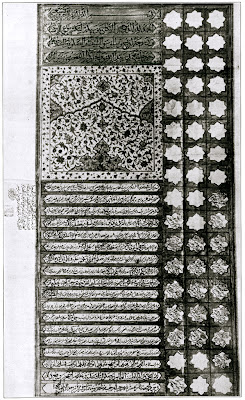
The Marriage Certificate of Khadíjih Bagum and The Báb, 1842.

The descendants of these two brothers-in-law of the Báb, along with the descendants of His maternal uncles, are known as the Afnán.

== Her recollections of the diaries and the first to believe ==
In August 1842 the Báb and Khadíjih Bagum married; they had one son, Ahmad, who died in infancy in 1843.

According to her own later account, she had recognized the Báb's special station before He had declared His mission to Mulla Husayn, relating these events that took place which confirmed her belief in Him:

...she saw the upper chamber of the House immersed in light. What was the source of all this light, and where had the lamps come from, she asked herself? But this was not tangible light; it was divine light, and she did not see it with her outward eyes but with her inner sight.

The Báb explained to her the next morning:

Know thou that the Almighty God is manifested in Me. I am the One whose advent the people of Islam have expected for over a thousand years. God has created Me for a great Cause, and you witnessed the divine revelation. Although I had not wished that you see Me in that state, yet God had so willed that there may not be any place in your heart for doubt and hesitation.

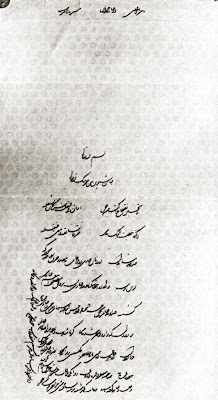
The first letter of the Báb to Khadijah Bagum, sent from Bushihr before His departure as a pilgrim to Mecca.

Because of the highly restricted Persian society of the 19th century, Mulla Husayn is historically recognized as the Báb-ul-Báb (the Gate of the Gate) because he was the first public disciple charged with going out to proclaim the faith.

Khadíjih Bagum held a strictly private yet chronologically prior conviction. Her role was focused entirely on supporting the Báb domestically and enduring the intense sacrifices that followed his declaration.

== Her life after the execution of the Báb ==
At the age of 30, after the Báb was martyred by a firing squad during the Qajars, she went to live with her sister's family. Before His execution, the Báb revealed a special prayer for Khadijih Bagum, knowing the trials and tribulations that awaited her, and this prayer has become one of the most memorized and beloved of all prayers in the Baha'i Faith: the Remover of Difficulties. She left behind detailed, firsthand oral and written recollections of her life with the Báb, Because she was a woman living in a highly restricted 19th-century Persian society, she did not write a formal published book herself. Instead, she shared her detailed, intimate memories with close family members who wrote them down word-for-word, these recollections were carefully recorded by her family members and form a core part of early Bahá'í historical literature.

When she received the message that Bahá'u'lláh was the one foretold by the Báb, "Him Whom God shall make manifest", she became a Bahá'í. "I did not hesitate for a moment and my submission for the religion was instantaneous and total."

She kept in correspondence with Bahá'u'lláh while she had returned to Shiraz and lived in the same home House of the Báb, during her marriage to the Báb. In 1882, Bahá'u'lláh invited her to come to the Holy Land and live with His family after He had accepted her request that her nephew marry one of Baha'u'llah's daughters. The nephew, however, made excuses that he could not travel to Shiraz from Yazd and went straight to Palestine himself; Khadijih Bagum was heartbroken, as women could not travel alone. She died only two months later, on 15 September 1882, and was buried in Shiraz in the Shah Chiragh. In the Kitáb-i-Badíʻ, Bahá'u'lláh gives her the title of Khayru'n Nisa (The Most Virtuous of Women).
