= Dalá'il-i-Sab'ih =

Daláʼil-i-Sabʻih (Persian: دلائل سبعه, "Seven Proofs") is the name referring to a pair of short apologetic works by the Báb, written in his native Persian and second language Arabic. The latter is a shorter supporting version of the former, and the relationship between the two has been compared to that of Arabic Bayán and Persian Bayán. Exact date of the book's composition has been subject to disagreements. However, internal evidence indicates that it was composed while the Báb was imprisoned in Maku, Iran, at the end of 1848.

== Content ==
These texts present seven "proofs" supporting the Báb's mission, explores his claim to be the Qa'im, references various prophetic Hadiths, and mentions several of the Báb's disciples by name.
