= Báb's house =

Home of Seyyed 'Alí Muhammad, the Báb, founder of the Bábí religion

Coordinates: 29.61225°N 52.54083°E

House of the Báb before its destruction in 1979

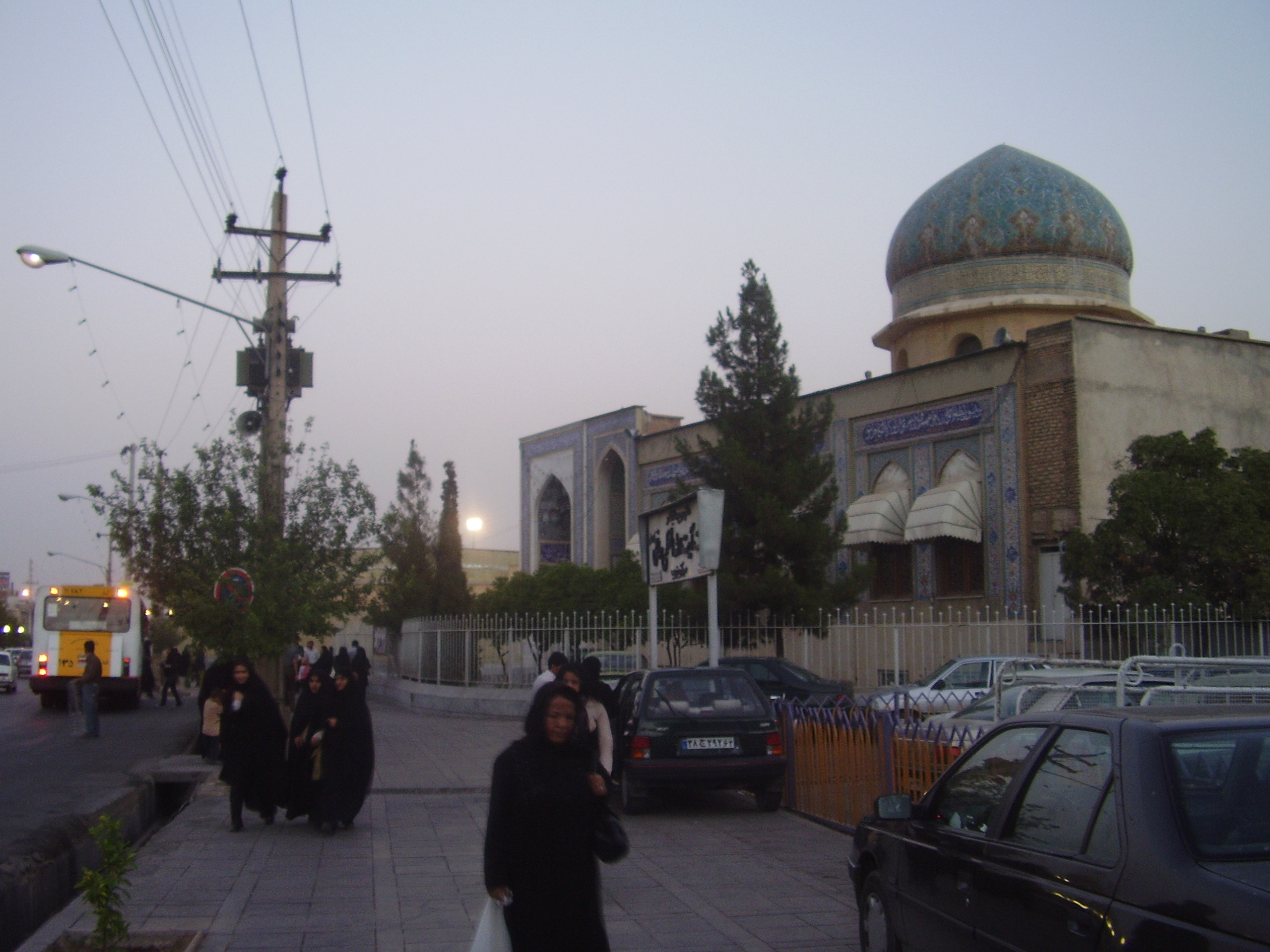
The Shiite mosque Bait al-Mahdi built on the location of Báb’s house

The house of the Báb in Shiraz, Iran, is considered a holy place to Bábís and Baháʼís. It was the location where the Báb proclaimed his religion for the first time.

In the Kitáb-i-Aqdas Baháʼu'lláh declared this house a place for Baháʼí pilgrimage. After major renovation in 1903, under the guidance of Abdu'l-Bahá, the house became the main Baháʼí holy place in Iran. During subsequent years this house was attacked by fanatics and demolished. In 1942 the house was the subject of arson. In 1955 in the midst of a series of persecutions of Baháʼís, which took place across Iran led by Mohammad Taghi Falsafi, the building was severely damaged.

In September 1979, after the Iranian revolution, the house was razed by religious fanatics. Following the demolition, in a letter dated 1 October 1979, Iran’s Baháʼí National Spiritual Assembly expressed their grievance over the house’s destruction. Members of the National Spiritual Assembly who wrote this letter were kidnapped the following year and are presumed killed.

== See also ==
- Mullá ʻAlíy-i-Bastámí
- Baháʼí Faith and the unity of humanity
- ʻAbdu'l-Bahá
- New world order (Baháʼí)
