= Qayyūm al-asmā =

1844 book, first long work of the Báb

Qayyūm al-asmā or Qayyúmu'l-Asmáʼ (Arabic: قيوم الأسماء; transl. "The Self-Subsisting Lord of All Names") is the first major work by Siyyid ʻAlí Muhammad Shírází, the Báb, after declaring himself to be the Qa'im, the eschatological figure expected by many in Shia Islam. Also known as the Tafsir Surat Yusuf (Commentary on the Surah of Joseph) or Aḥsan al-Qiṣaṣ (the Best of Stories), the book is an unconventional form of commentary on Surah 12 in the Qurʼan: Surat Yusuf, and beyond that the Qurʼan as a whole. Although drawing on verses from the Surah of Joseph, the content often strays significantly from the explicit meaning of the text. The composition is deliberately similar in its structure and style to the Qurʼan: composed entirely in Arabic, it contains 111 chapters (the Surah of Joseph contains 111 verses) designated as Surahs, each with 42 verses (Āyah), is written in Saj' rhyming prose, and refers to itself within the text as 'the recitation' (qu'rān) or 'the criterion' (furqān, Qu'ran 25:1). While ostensibly the Qayyūm al-asmā is an esoteric commentary on the story of Joseph and the principles of Islam, inwardly it stakes a much larger claim, making evocative and enigmatic addresses to humanity on the need for renewed spiritual and ethical teachings. It guardedly announces the birth of a new and hidden cause, and the arrival of the Day of God; simultaneously it aims to prepare the world for the imminent arrival of the "Promised One" of all ages, with the author himself making veiled and direct claims to divine revelation. The provocative and stimulating nature of this work ignited significant religious fervor throughout Persia, quickly galvanizing both devoted followers and fanatical critics alike, and ultimately sparking the birth of the Babi Faith.

== Name ==
In the standard English transliteration, the name of the essay is "Qayyūm al-asmā". Its meaning in Arabic can be rendered as "the maintainer of the names [of God]", "The Self-Subsisting [Lord] of All Names", or "The Self-Subsisting Loci of the Divine Names". The names here refer to the 99 names of God (Allah) in Islam. "The Self-Subsisting One" (al-qayyūm) is the 63rd name of God, and it is etymologically linked to the term Qa'im, a central theme in the work and others of the Báb. The book is sometimes called the Tafsir Surat Yusuf (The Commentary on the Surah of Joseph), or Aḥsan al-Qiṣaṣ, meaning the "best" or "most beautiful" of all stories, an allusion to the Surah which the book is ostensibly focused on. "Aḥsan al-Qiṣaṣ" comes from the well-known name for Surat Yusuf in general, derived from the third verse of that chapter of the Qur'an (Surah 12:3).

== History ==
The Qayyūm al-asmā is considered to be the first major book written by the Báb after the commencement of his mission. In the evening hours of May 22, 1844, the Báb proclaimed himself as a divine emissary, the Báb (gate), and then later the return of the Twelfth Imam, whom the Shiites are waiting to return at the end of days to fill the earth with justice after its being filled with oppression, a figure widely considered as the inaugurator of the eschatological age and the end of human history. In the Kitáb-i-Íqán (The Book of Certitude), Baháʼu'lláh, one of the most prominent early Babis, founder of the Baháʼí Faith, and who claimed to be the promised one foretold by the Báb, lauds the Qayyūm al-asmā as "the first, the greatest and mightiest of all books". The Báb wrote the first surah of the book, called Surat al-Muluk (Arabic: Surah al-Maluk), or Surah of the Kings, in the presence of Mullah Hussein Bushru'i on the evening of May 22, 1844.

According to the claims of Bábi believers, the writing of the book — hundreds of pages long — was relatively quick. It is described in their writings that the Báb wrote the entire book in 40 days, in a kind of ecstasy of divine inspiration. However, academic sources suggest that the number forty is typological only and does not necessarily indicate a period of forty consecutive days, but rather took place over the course of several months. The Qayyūm al-asmā was the earliest and most central book of the Bábi faith in its first year. Preachers of the Bábi faith, like Mullah Hussein Bushru'i, took copies of the essay and distributed it outside of Shiraz. While many were electrified by the messianic claims in the book, its spread in cities and communities throughout the Islamic world precipitated early backlashes from some conservative Islamic authorities. Mullá ʻAlíy-i-Bastámí, the second disciple of the Báb (Letters of the Living), was tasked with proclaiming the advent of the Báb in the Shi'a holy cities of Najaf and Karbila, and brought with him a copy of the Qayyūm al-asmā. Within a few months he was put on trial for heresy on the basis of an analysis by Sunni and Shi'a clerics of the copy of the Qayyūm al-asmā he brought with him on his mission. He later faced death during imprisonment related to these charges.

== Structure and Content ==
The composition consists of 111 Surahs, the same as the number of verses in the Qurʾānic Surat Yusuf. At the top of each sura appears the basmalah, meaning the Muslim invocation Bismillah al-raḥman al-raḥim ("In the Name of God, the Merciful, the Compassionate"), which appears at the top of every surah in the Qurʾān except the ninth. The appearance of this formula, unique to the structure of the Qurʾān, adds to the connection that the author sought to create between the existence of al-Asma and the holy book of Islam. Additionally, one can discern another Qurʾānic characteristic in al-Asma — at the beginning of the Surahs there appear mysterious separate letters, similar to those in the Qurʾān.

The composition is markedly different from usual works of Qurʾānic exegesis: much of the book deals with the religious and messianic doctrines of the Báb, with only slight connections to the Qurʾānic Surah. There are almost no elements in the composition that mirror the usual style of Qurʾānic interpretations, rather it is a new kind of composition. In the few times that the Báb writes an interpretation of a particular Qurʾānic verse, this interpretation is an allegorical, esoteric, and mystical one, using Tawil and not Tafsir.

In this work, the interpretation of the Qurʾān becomes a divine revelation, and revelation is used as a tool for interpretation. The entire composition is inspired by the Qurʾānic style, with a considerable amount of Qurʾānic terminology. For example, in Surah 4 verse 13 in the Qayyūm al-asmā, the Báb writes: "We [the Hidden Imam] have brought down this book about our servant and our servant [the Báb] [by virtue of] a divine permit [in a form that] resembles [the Qurʾān]." In the first Surah of the Book, the Hidden Imam says: "We have revealed to you [the Báb] all that God has revealed to us [the imams]." Here the Báb is depicted as a mediator between the Hidden Imam and humanity.

Along with these 'moderate' statements, one can find in the book 'bold' statements that describe this book as a new revelation from God, that is, as the new Qurʾān. These statements bring the status of the Báb closer to that of a prophet. Elsewhere in the book one can find verses that proclaim the Báb as a divine manifestation himself, i.e., as the Manifestation of God on earth: "Indeed I am God, and there is no god but me" (Al-Asma, Surah 22:21).

== Table of Surahs ==
#	Anglicized title	Arabic title	English title(s)	Muqatta'at (isolated letters)	Main theme(s)
1	Al-Mulk	المُلْك al-Mulk	The Dominion, The Kingdom, The Sovereignty		
2	Al-Ulama	العُلَمَاء al-ʿUlamāʾ	The Learned, The Clerics	Alif Lam Ra, Alif Lam Mim	
3	Al-Iman	الإِيمَان al-ʾĪmān	The Faith	Ta Ha	
4	Al-Madinah	المَدينَة al-Madīnah	The City (Medina or Shiraz)	Alif Lam Mim Ta Ha	
5	Yusuf	يوسُف Yūsuf	Joseph	Alif Lam Mim 'Ayin	
6	Ash-Shahadah	الشَّهادَة Ash-Shahādah	The Testimony	Alif Lam Mim Sin	
7	Az-Ziyarah	الزِّيَارَة Az-Ziyārah	The Visitation	Ta Sin	
