= John Walbridge =

Scholar of Islamic philosophy and Islamic intellectual history

John Walbridge is a scholar of Islamic philosophy and Islamic intellectual history. He is professor of Middle Eastern languages and cultures at Indiana University.

== Works ==
- God and Logic in Islam: The Caliphate of Reason (2010)
- The Wisdom of the Mystic East: Suhrawardi and Platonic Orientalism (2001)
- The Leaven of the Ancients: Suhrawardi and the Heritage of the Greeks (2000)
- Sacred Acts, Sacred Space, Sacred Time (1996)
- The Science of Mystic Lights: Quṭb Al-Dīn Shīrāzī and the Illuminationist Tradition in Islamic Philosophy (1992)
