= Kitábu'l-Asmáʼ =

Religious text by the Báb

The Kitábu'l-Asmáʼ (Arabic: کتاب الأسماء; Book of Divine Names), also known as the Chahár Shaʻn (Persian: چهار شأن; The [Book of the] Four Grades) is a book written by the Báb, the founder of Bábi religion, in Arabic during his imprisonment in Máh-Kú and Chihriq in Iran (1847–1850). With a total volume of more than 3,000 pages, it is the largest revealed scripture in religious history. Stephen Lambden describes the Kitábu'l-Asmáʼ as "one of the most theologically weighty or important writings of the Bab".

At least twenty-six manuscripts exist, and much of the text has not yet been located. Some extracts are available in English in the volume Selections from the Writings of the Báb.

== Contents ==
The text is divided in nineteen unities (Vahid) and 361 gates (Báb; chapters). and consists largely of "lengthy variations of invocations of the names of God'. Each name is discussed in four different parts, each part written in a different 'mode of revelation': divine verses, prayers, commentaries, and rational arguments. The 361 chapters symbolize "all things" (Kull-i-Shayʼ) and the days of the year of the Badi' calendar. Where the materials about the calendar are located in the Kitábu'l-Asmáʼ needs further research.

In The sources for early Bábí doctrine and history, the Kitábu'l-Asmáʼ is described as a work that could be of "much interest to the psychologist of religious inspiration". In a stream of consciousness style, the Báb explores many divine names and attributes and describes how humanity can be spiritualized by recognizing the Manifestation of God.

When recited aloud in the original Arabic, many passages have an "invocatory, rhythmic intensity".

== Quotes ==
"Be lovingly watchful of one another and thus improve your affairs. Should ye find amongst you one who is afflicted with grief, remove his sorrow by any means in your power, and should ye find one stricken with poverty, enrich him to the extent of your ability. If ye find in your midst one who is abased, exalt him to the extent ye can, and if ye find one who is veiled by ignorance, educate him to the degree of your capacity. Should ye find amongst yourselves one who is single, help him to marry, in accordance with the divine law, to the limits of your ability, and should ye find one who is in distress, bring him tranquility by any means in your power. . . . Gaze upon others with the same eyes with which ye gaze upon your own selves. . . . If ye find in your midst one who is hungry, send him, in truth and to the extent of your power, food in such a way that his heart will not be saddened, and if ye find one who has no clothes, provide him with clothes in the most dignified manner, to the extent possible for you. Look then not at your selves and your possessions, but rather look at God, Who hath created you and conferred upon you from His kingdom that which is your lot." (29:423-24, Provisional translation by Nader Saiedi )

"Say: God verily cultivateth on earth, as He pleaseth, at His bidding. Will ye not behold? Think ye that ye are the sowers? Say: Glorified be God! We are, verily, the Cultivators. Say: Gaze then not upon any one save even as ye behold the most exalted of the renowned amongst you. Verily that which I attest with regard to both the rulers and the peasants amongst you, is the same thing: all have arisen at the bidding of God." (29:383-86, Provisional translation by Nader Saiedi )
