= Mullá ʻAlíy-i-Bastámí =

Mullá ʻAlí-i-Bastámí (died 1846) was the second Letter of the Living in the Bábí movement. He is also probably the first and one of the best known martyrs of the early Bábí period.

== Biography ==
=== Early life ===
He was born near the small city of Bastam in northwestern Persia during the reign of the Qajar dynasty. He married in his youth and had at least one child. As a young man he gained a reputation for his interest in religion, and studied as a Mullah in the shrine city of Mashhad.

In Mashhad he became familiar with local clerics who were associated with the millenarian Shaykhí denomination of Shia Islam and was attracted to Shaykhí doctrine. Eventually he moved to Karbala in the Ottoman Empire, and studied under Siyyid Kazim Rashti, then the leader of Shaykhism, for at least seven years.

=== Conversion to Bábism ===
Shaykhís expected the imminent arrival of the Qa'im or Mahdi, and after the death of Siyyid Kazim in January 1844, Bastámí led a group of Shaykhís who, along with a group led by Mullá Husayn, sought out the expected Mahdi. On May 22, 1844, Mullá Husayn became the first Shaykhí to accept a Shirazi merchant named Siyyid ʿAli Muhammad as the Mahdi predicted in Islamic eschatology; Bastámí reportedly converted rapidly after hearing some verses of the Qayyúmu'l-Asmáʼ written by Ali Muhammad. ʿAli Muhammad would later take on the title of the Báb, meaning "gate" in Arabic and declare himself to be a Manifestation of God founding the new religion of Bábism. Bastámí accepted the Báb as the Mahdi on their first meeting and was appointed by him to the position of one of eighteen Letters of the Living and identified as the allegorical return of the Shia Imam 'Ali. Most sources identify him as the second Letter of the Living, but a minority say he was the fourth. A tablet was addressed by the Báb to each of the Letters of the Living, including Bastámí; no translation of this tablet into English exists at present.

=== Trial in Baghdad ===
The Báb gave Bastámí the very specific mission of leaving Persia and travelling to the holy Shiʻa shrine cities of Najaf and Karbala in modern-day Iraq about the summer of 1844. It was here he was to announce the Báb's mission to mujtahid Shaykh Muhammad Hasan al-Najafi, a senior member of the Shiʻa clergy. He was put on trial for heresy on the basis of a copy of the Qayyúmu'l-Asmáʼ in his possession on 13 January 1845 by a combined panel of Shiʻa and Sunni clerics. The trial spun into a political event pitting Ottoman/Sunni interests against Shiʻa/Persian interests – the Sunni clergy wanted Bastamí to be immediately executed, while the Shiʻa clergy insisted only on banishment, and Persian politicians requested his removal to Persia. Instead, in April, he was transferred to Istanbul where he was further sentenced to hard labour in Istanbul's docks. Persian politicians continued insisting, but when the Ottomans finally agreed, 4 December 1846, it was found he had died a few days before, and was accounted to be the first Bábi martyr by Bábis and Baháʼís. After his death a visitation prayer was revealed by the Báb in his honor.
