= Arabic Bayán =

Text by the Báb, written ca. 1848

The Arabic Bayán (Arabic: البيان العربي, romanized: al-Bayān al-ʿarabī) is an unfinished book in Arabic written by the Báb around 1848. It functions as a significant scripture in Bábism, asserting that it is a product of divine revelation and inspiration.

== Etymology and meaning ==
The word Bayán literally means declaration or elucidation. In the context of Bábism, this term is used to refer to the writings of the Bāb in general, but usually is applied to two specific works, including Arabic Bayán. Its larger sister book is in Persian, called the Persian Bayán.

== History ==
Exact date of the book's composition has been subject to disagreements. However, internal evidence indicates that it was composed while the Báb was imprisoned in Maku, Iran, at the end of 1848. At that time, the Báb's restrictions were not severe, and he was permitted to write and communicate with his followers. However, he did not manage to make the Arabic Bayán complete and it remained unfinished with his execution in 1850.

Following clashes between Bábis and the Persian government, Bábi works including the Arabic Bayán were banned. This made them hard to procure. Only some thirteen manuscripts of this work, including an autograph, are known to exist. Unlike Azalis, the Baháʼís showed little interest in preserving or distributing this work because they assumed it was abrogated and superseded by their own scripture. The autograph was printed using lithography and circulated in Tehran by the Azalis, and it was later republished in 1957 by 'Abd al-Razzaq al-Hasani in his book al-Bābīyūn wa’l-Bahāʾīyūn.

== Text and arrangement ==
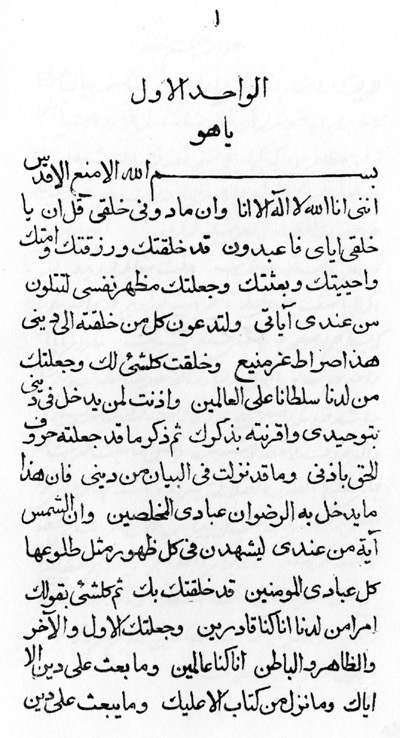
First page from the first wāḥed

=== External structure ===
The book was intended to comprise nineteen chapters (wāḥeds), each containing nineteen abwāb. Nonetheless it is incomplete, and contains only eleven chapters. The number nineteen was arranged for the sake of symbolism and according to Abjad numerals. Other Bábi sources imply that the rest of chapters were to be written by Báb's successor, Subh-i-Azal. Each of the abwāb is slightly longer than a verse, which leads to a high degree of compression in the wāḥeds and results in "little or no logic in the sequence of subjects".

== Translations ==
The book has been translated into French twice. Arthur de Gobineau first published an incomplete and inaccurate translation of the work in his Les religions et les philosophies dans l'Asie centrale (1865), as part of the appendix "Ketab-è Hukkam". The second translation was made by A. L. M. Nicolas, published under the title Le Beyan arabe in 1905. This work was of the earliest sources that enabled the Western world to understand Bábism.
