= Báb =

Iranian prophet (1819–1850)

The Báb
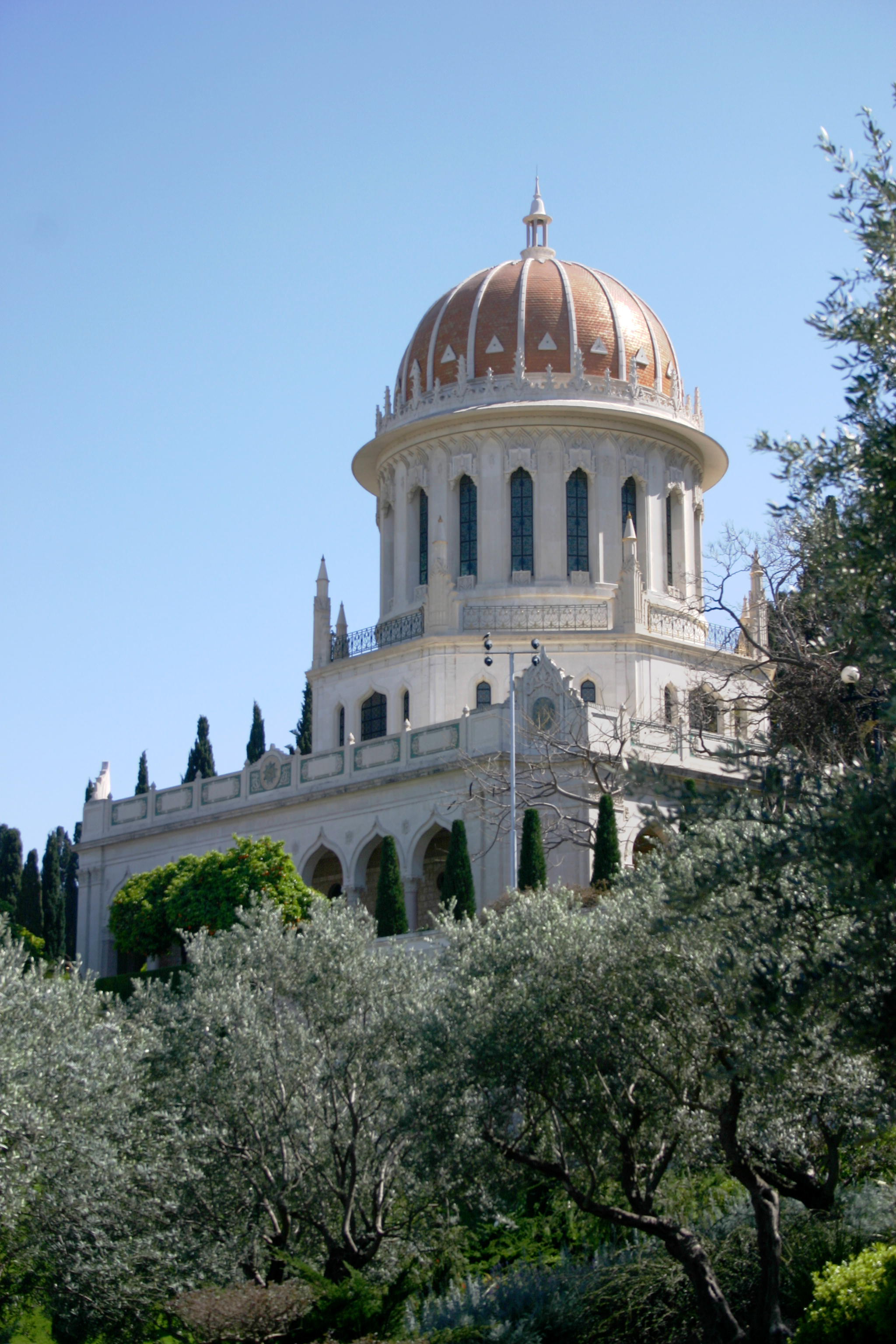
- Shrine of the Báb in Haifa, Israel

Personal life
- Born: ʻAlí-Muḥammad; 20 October 1819 Shiraz, Iran
- Died: 9 July 1850 (aged 30) Tabriz, Iran
- Cause of death: Execution by firing squad
- Resting place: 32°48′52″N 34°59′14″E
- Spouse: Khadíjih-Sultán (1842–1850)
- Children: Ahmad (1843–1843)
- Parent(s): Mirzá Muhammad Ridá (father); Fátimih Bagum (mother)
- Known for: Founder of Bábism; Central figure in Baháʼí Faith
- Occupation: Merchant; Religious leader
- Relatives: Afnán

Religious life
- Religion: Bábism

Senior posting
- Successor: He whom God shall make manifest (believed to be Baháʼu'lláh by Baháʼís)
- Disciples: Notable students: Letters of the Living; Baháʼu'lláh; Subh-i-Azal

The Báb (born ʻAlí-Muḥammad Shírází; /ˈæli moʊˈhæməd/; Persian: علی‌محمد شیرازی; 20 October 1819 – 9 July 1850) was an Iranian religious leader who founded Bábism, and is also one of the central figures of the Baháʼí Faith. The Báb gradually and progressively revealed his claim in his extensive writings to be a Manifestation of God, of a status as great as Moses, Jesus, and Prophet Muhammad, receiving revelations as profound as the Torah, Gospel, and Quran. (Note: Although, it was clear from Qayyūm al-asmā, the first work of the Báb after his declaration, that he claimed to be a recipient of divine revelation. As a matter of fact Mullá ʻAlíy-i-Bastámí the second disciple of the Báb was condemned jointly by an assembled group of Shiite and Sunni clerics on a charge of heresy in Iraq in 1844 (the year of the declaration of the Báb), because he believed in the author of a work (Qayyūm al-asmā) that claimed to be a revelation of God.) This new revelation, he claimed, would release the creative energies and capacities necessary for the establishment of global unity and peace.

He referred to himself by the traditional Muslim title "Báb" (meaning "the gate") (Note: The term Báb (/bɑːb/; Arabic: باب; meaning "Gate" or "Door", is a reference to the deputy of the Hidden Imam) although it was apparent from the context that he intended by this term a spiritual claim very different from any which had previously been associated with it. He proclaimed that the central purpose of his mission was to prepare for the coming of a spiritual luminary greater than himself — the promised one of the world's great religions; he referred to this promised deliverer as "he whom God will make manifest". The Báb was the "gateway" to this messianic figure, whose message would be carried throughout the world.

The Báb was born in Shiraz on 20 October 1819, to a family of sayyids of Husaynid lineage, most of whom were engaged in mercantile activities in Shiraz and Bushehr. He was a merchant from Shiraz in Qajar Iran who, in 1844 at the age of 25, began the Bábi Faith. In the next six years, the Báb composed numerous letters and books in which he abrogated Islamic laws and traditions, establishing a new religion and introducing a new social order focused on unity, love, and service to others. He encouraged the learning of arts and sciences, modernizing education, and improving the status of women. He introduced the concept of progressive revelation, highlighting the continuity and renewal of religion. He also emphasized ethics, independent investigation of truth, and human nobility. Additionally, he provided prescriptions to regulate marriage, divorce, and inheritance, and set forth rules for a future Bábí society, although these were never implemented. Throughout, the Báb always discussed his own revelation and laws in the context of the aforementioned promised figure. Unlike previous religions, which sporadically alluded to promised figures, the primary focus of the Bayán, the foundational text of the Bábí faith, was to prepare for the arrival of the promised one. The Báb was popular among the lower classes, the poor and the urban merchants, artisans, and some villagers. However, he faced opposition from the orthodox clergy and the government, which eventually executed him and thousands of his followers, who were known as Bábís. (Note: In three instances where Bábís were besieged and under attack by the Iranian army, they defended themselves. Eventually almost all of them were massacred. The Báb never permitted Jihad and taught his followers to be peaceful and not convert by the sword.)

When the Báb was executed for apostasy, he was tied up in a public square in Tabriz and faced a firing squad. Following the first volley, the Báb was discovered to be missing and later found and returned to the square. He was eventually killed by the second volley. Accounts differ on the details, but all agree that the first volley failed to kill him. (Note: Some accounts say Anís succumbed to death on the first volley, another that the Báb was dispatched by a sword. The bullets had cut the rope suspending them from the wall. See Firuz Kazemzadeh, Kazem Kazemzadeh, and Howard Garey, "The Báb: Accounts of His Martyrdom", in World Order, vol. 8, no. 1 (Fall, 1973), 32. All accounts, even the Muslim ones, concur that the Báb survived the first volley.) This widely documented event increased interest in his message. His remains were secretly stored and transported until they were interred in 1909 into the shrine built for them by ʻAbdu'l-Bahá on the slopes of Mount Carmel.

To Baháʼís, the Báb fills a similar role as Elijah in Judaism or John the Baptist in Christianity: a forerunner or founder of their own religion. Adherence to the Báb as a divine messenger has survived into modern times in the form of the 8-million-member Baháʼí Faith, whose founder, Baháʼu'lláh, claimed in 1863 to be the fulfillment of the Báb's prophecy. The majority of Bábí adherents converted and became Baháʼís by the end of the 19th century. The Baháʼís consider him a Manifestation of God, like Adam, Abraham, Moses, Zoroaster, Krishna, the Buddha, Jesus, Prophet Muhammad and Baháʼu'lláh.

== Background ==
=== Early life ===
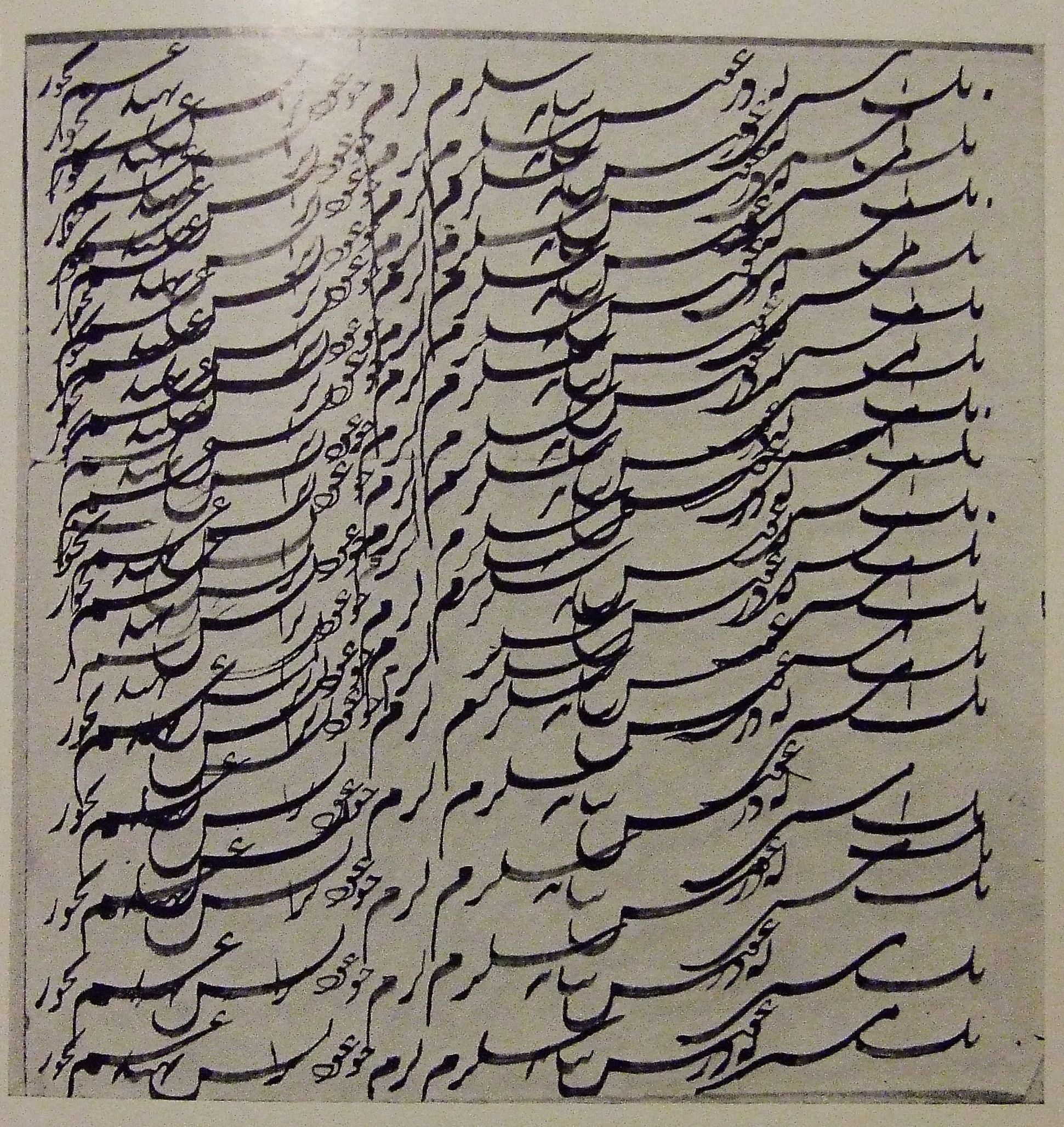
Calligraphic exercise of the Báb written before ten years old

The Báb was born on 20 October 1819 (1 Muharram 1235 AH/27 Mehr 1198 SH), in Shiraz to a middle-class Twelver Shia merchant of the city and given the name ʿAlí Muḥammad. He was a Sayyid, descendant of Prophet Muhammad, with both parents tracing their lineage through Husayn ibn Ali. His father was Muhammad Riḍá, and his mother was Fátimih (1800–1881), a daughter of a prominent Shiraz merchant. She later became a Baháʼí. His father died when he was quite young, and his maternal uncle Hájí Mírzá Siyyid ʿAlí, a merchant, reared him.

In Shiraz, his uncle sent him to a maktab primary school, where he remained for six or seven years. In contrast to the formal, orthodox theology which dominated the school curriculum of the time, which included the study of jurisprudence and Arabic grammar, the Báb from a young age felt inclined towards unconventional subjects like mathematics and calligraphy, which were little studied. The Báb's preoccupation with spirituality, creativity and imagination also angered his teachers and was not tolerated in the atmosphere of the 19th-century Persian school system. This led the Báb to become disillusioned with the education system; he later instructed adults to treat children with dignity, to allow children to have toys and engage in play and to never show anger or harshness to their students.

Sometime between the ages 15 and 20 he joined his uncle in the family business, a trading house, and became a merchant in the city of Bushehr, Iran, near the Persian Gulf. As a merchant, he was renowned for his honesty and trustworthiness in his business, which was focused on trade with India, Oman, and Bahrain. Some of his earlier writings suggest that he did not enjoy the business and instead applied himself to the study of religious literature.

=== Marriage ===
In 1842, at age 23 and following his mother's wishes, he married 20-year-old Khadíjih-Sultán Bagum (1822–1882), the daughter of a prominent merchant in Shíráz. The marriage proved a happy one, though their only child – a boy named Ahmad – died the year he was born (1843) and Khadijih never conceived again. The young couple occupied a modest house in Shiraz along with the Báb's mother. Later, Khadijih became a Baháʼí.

=== Shaykhi movement ===
In the 1790s in Iraq, Shaykh Ahmad (1753–1826) began a religious school of thought within Shia Islam. His followers, who became known as Shaykhis, were expecting the imminent return of divine guidance through the appearance of the Mahdi, the Hidden Imam, or a deputy of the Hidden Imam. He took a less-literalist approach to Islamic teachings, for example teaching that the material body of Muhammad did not ascend during the Mi'raj, and that the expected Resurrection of the Dead was spiritual in nature. Shaykh Ahmad came into conflict with the orthodox Shia theologians of the time and was denounced as an infidel in 1824.

After Shaykh Ahmad's death, leadership passed to Kazim Rashti (1793–1843), and emphasis was placed on the year 1260 AH (1844 CE), one thousand lunar years after the twelfth Imam went into occultation. In 1841 the Báb went on pilgrimage to Iraq and stayed for seven months mostly in and around Karbala, where he attended lectures of Kazim Rashti. As of his death in December 1843, Kazim Rashti counselled his followers to leave their homes to seek the Mahdi, who, according to his prophecies, would soon appear. One of these followers, Mullá Husayn, after keeping vigil for 40 days in a mosque, travelled to Shiraz, where he met the Báb.

=== Personality and appearance ===
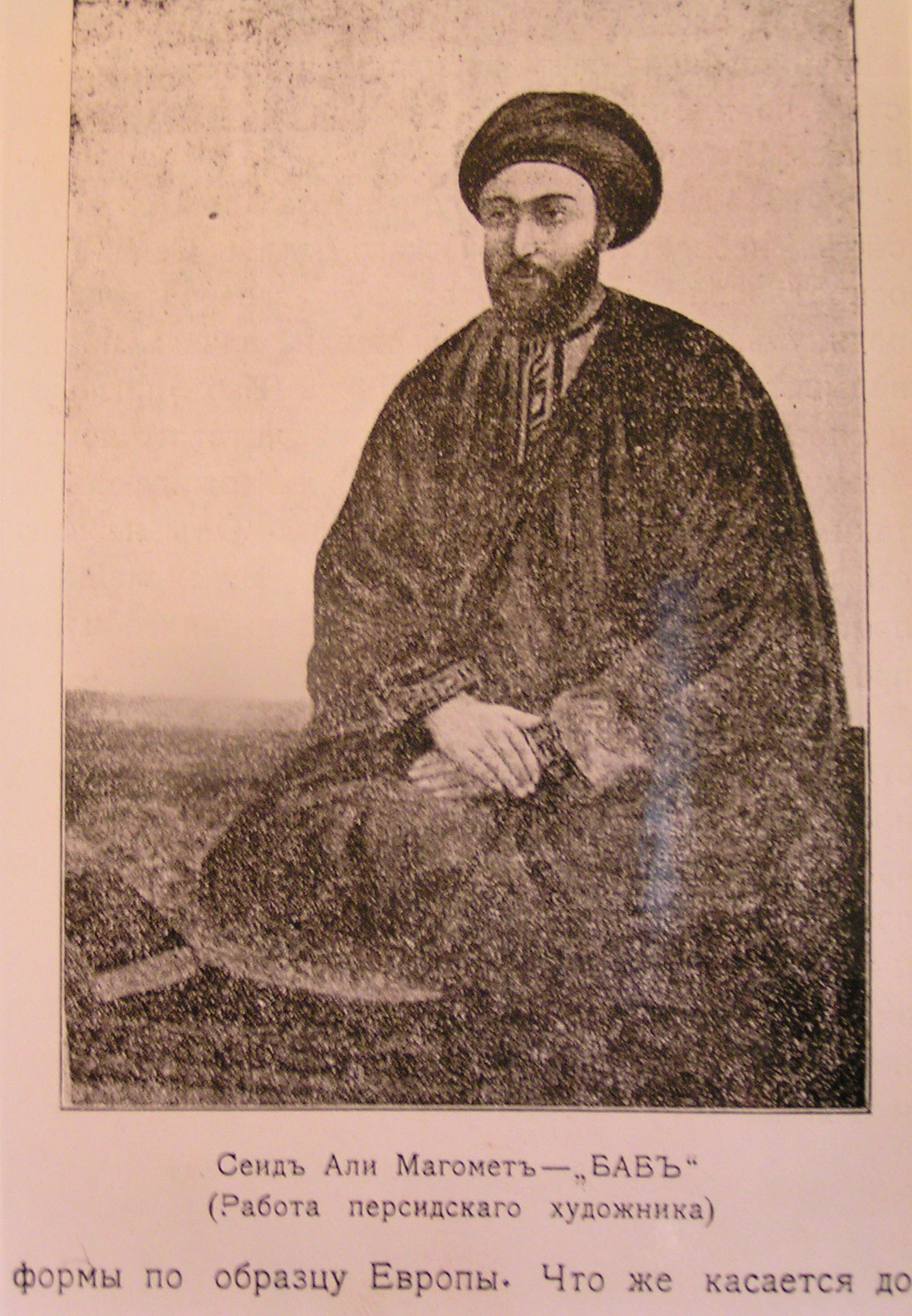
A historical depiction of the Báb

Sources commonly describe the Báb as gentle, precocious, or gifted with great intelligence. One of his contemporary followers described him as:

...very taciturn, and [he] would never utter a word unless it was absolutely necessary. He did not even answer our questions. He was constantly absorbed in his own thoughts, and was preoccupied with repetition of his prayers and verses. He is described as a handsome man with a thin beard, dressed in clean clothes, wearing a green shawl and a black turban. (Note: Hajji Muhammad Husayn, quoted in Amanat 1989, pp. 132–133.)

An Irish physician described him as "a very mild and delicate-looking man, rather small in stature and very fair for a Persian, with a melodious soft voice, which struck me much". Shoghi Effendi notes "the gentle, the youthful and irresistible person of the Báb" and praises him as being "matchless in His meekness, imperturbable in His serenity, magnetic in His utterance" This personality has been described as having "captivated many of those who met him".

== Declaration ==
The Báb's mission as a religious leader began with a dream in which he drank seven drops of blood dripping from the lacerated throat of Imam Husayn – a significant martyr and symbol of sacrifice in Shia Islam. Although previously inclined toward sharing the Qur'an, it was after this dream that he was able to write his own verses and prayers, claiming divine inspiration. In April 1844, his wife Khadijih became the first to believe in his revelation.

=== Declaration to Mullá Husayn ===
The room where the Declaration of the Báb took place on the evening of 22 May 1844, in his house in Shiraz.

The Báb's first religiously inspired experience, claimed and witnessed by his wife, is dated to about the evening of 3 April 1844. The Báb's first public connection with his sense of a mission came with the arrival of Mullá Husayn in Shiraz. On the night of 22 May, Mullá Husayn was invited by the Báb to his home (Note: Mullá Husayn was met at the gate of Shiraz by the Báb, they knew each other from having met previously in Karbala.) where Mullá Husayn told him of his search for the possible successor to Kazim Rashti, the Promised One. The Báb claimed this, and to be the bearer of divine knowledge. Mullá Husayn became the first to accept the Báb's claims to be an inspired figure and a likely successor to Kazim Rashti. The Báb had replied satisfactorily to all of Mullá Husayn's questions and had written in his presence, with extreme rapidity, a long tafsir, commentary, on Surah Yusuf, known as the Qayyúmu'l-Asmáʼ and considered the Báb's first revealed work. The date has been adopted as a Baháʼí Holy Day.

=== Letters of the Living ===
Mullá Husayn became the Báb's first disciple. Within five months, seventeen other disciples of Kazim Rashti recognized the Báb as a Manifestation of God. Among them was a woman, Fátimih Zarrín Táj Barag͟háni, a poet, who later received the name of Táhirih, the Pure. These 18 disciples later became known as the Letters of the Living (each soul containing one letter of the Spirit of God, which combine to form the Word) and given the task of spreading the new faith (understood as the return or continuation of the one Faith of Abraham) across Iran and Iraq. The Báb emphasized the spiritual station of these 18 individuals, who, along with himself, made the first "Unity" of his religion according to the Arabic term wāḥid, unity, that has a numerical value of 19 using abjad numerals. The Báb's book, the Persian Bayán, gives the metaphorical identity of the Letters of the Living as the Fourteen Infallibles of Twelver Shiʿi Islam: Muhammad, the Twelve Imams, and Fatimah, and the four archangels.

=== Pilgrimage to Mecca ===
After the eighteen Letters of the Living recognized him, the Báb and Quddús left on a pilgrimage to Mecca and Medina, the sacred cities of Islam. At the Kaaba in Mecca, the Báb publicly claimed to be the Qa'im, and wrote to the Sharif of Mecca, the Custodian of the Kaaba, proclaiming his mission. After their pilgrimage, the Báb and Quddús returned to Bushehr, where they last saw each other.

=== Return to Shiraz ===
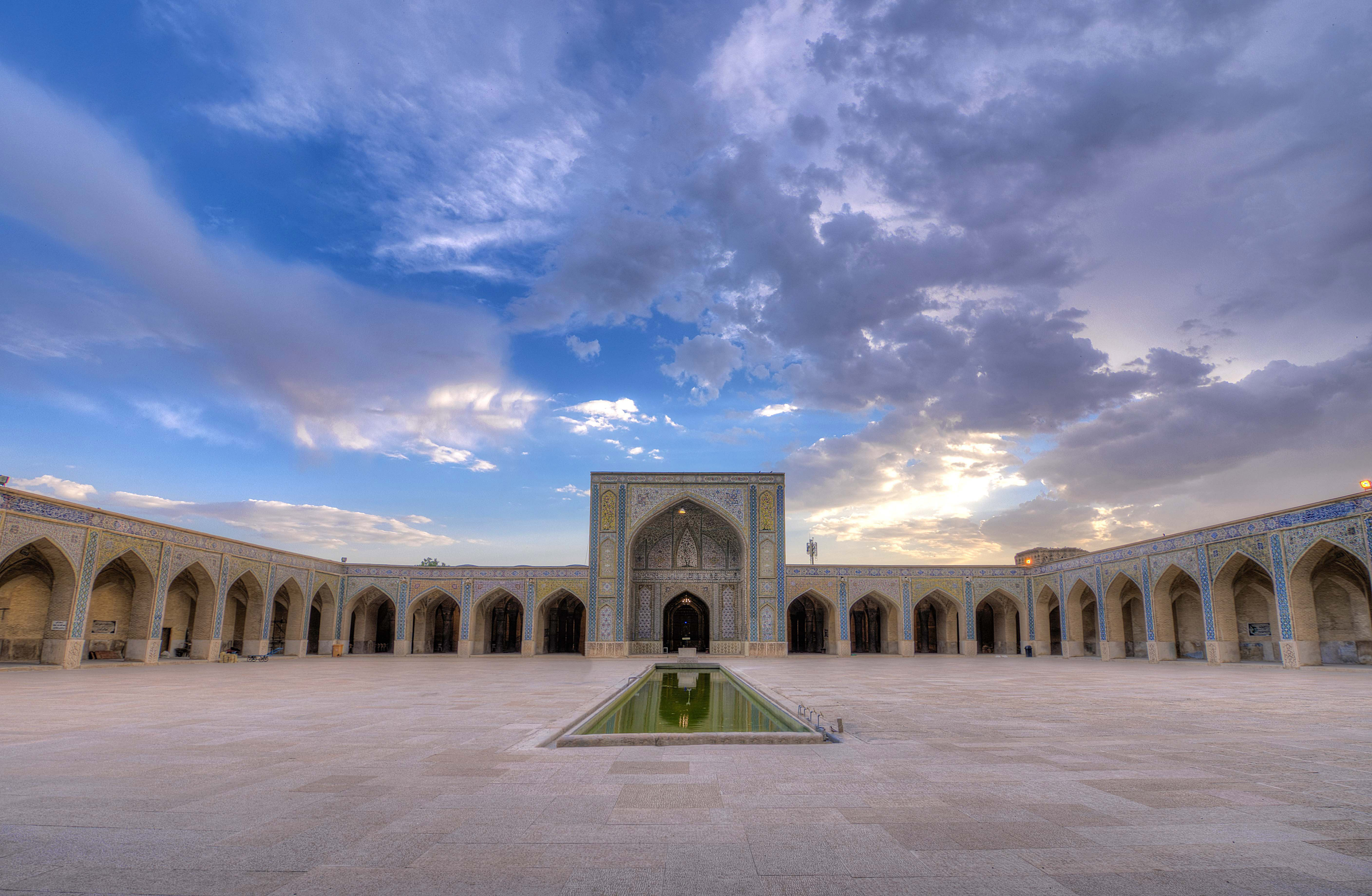
Vakil Mosque, Shiraz

Quddús' travel to Shiraz brought the Báb's claim to the attention of the governor, Husayn Khan, who tortured Quddús and summoned the Báb to Shiraz in June 1845. On October 15, 1845, during Ramadan, the Báb had a confrontation with Islamic clergy (the ulema).

Shaykh Abū Turáb, the Imam-Jum'ih of Shiraz, questioned Báb about his claims. He denied that he was the representative of the Hidden Imam or an intermediary to the faithful; the Báb later repeated the same in front of a congregation at the Vakil Mosque. This renunciation saved him from immediate execution. According to Abbas Amanat in conformity with his own policy of prudence during the early stages of his mission, the Báb wrote a statement renouncing his claims to the position of Bábiya (gatehood) and disowning those who advocated such beliefs about him.His tone, conduct, behaviour, and calm demeanour before a partly hostile audience impressed many of those in attendance and encouraged others in Shiraz to inquire further about His position and become adherents.

The Báb’s denial that he was a representative or intermediary of the Hidden Imam—a figure believed by Twelver Shiʻis to have entered occultation in the ninth century—appears to have been a rejection of superstitious ideas associated with that belief. At the same time, he indicated that his own station was far greater than that of an Imam or an Imam’s representative. He later explicitly claimed to be a manifestation of God, and explained that, in the earlier phase of his ministry, he had deliberately veiled his true identity out of compassion, so that his message could be understood gradually by the people.

It became apparent later that by the title "Báb" ("the gate") the Báb intended a spiritual claim very different from the traditional Islamic title "Báb" which referred to the intermediary or gate to the Imam. He proclaimed that the central purpose of his mission was to prepare for the coming of the promised one of the world's great religions; he referred to this promised deliverer as "he whom God will make manifest". The Báb was the "gateway" to this messianic figure, whose message would be carried throughout the world.

A correspondent for The Times, in their publication on November 19, 1845, wrote that the Báb "very wisely denied the charge of apostasy laid against him and thus escaped from punishment." Samuel Graham Wilson, an American Presbyterian missionary in Tabriz, wrote in 1915 that the Báb had signed a recantation at his examination at Shiraz, based on the report of Frenchman A. L. M. Nicolas in the introduction to his 1911 translation of the Persian Bayán. The sole document that is alleged to include the recantation is part of the collection of a manuscript titled Ṣaḥīfa-yi Jaʻfariyya, housed at the Princeton University Library, within the materials donated to the library by William McElwee Miller, provided by Jelal Azal, a grandson of Subh-i-Azal. According to Abbas Amanat, despite the fact that the content of this document is not backed by any other source, its style and tone show its originality. Denis MacEoin disagrees, stating that the text as a whole "could not have been written at the time suggested by Jelal Azal, since several passages are stated in the text to have been composed on various days in the month of Muharram." At the time, the Báb was still in Arabia performing hajj and some other parts of the text suggest that they were written after his return to Iran.

=== Confinement ===
The Báb was placed under house arrest at the home of his uncle until a cholera epidemic broke out in the city in September 1846. Once released he departed for Isfahan. There, many came to see him at the house of the Imam-Jum'ih, who became sympathetic. After an informal gathering where the Báb debated the local clergy and displayed his speed in producing instantaneous verses, his popularity soared. After the death of the governor of Isfahan, Manouchehr Khan Gorji, his supporter, pressure from the clergy of the province led to Mohammad Shah Qajar ordering the Báb to Tehran in January 1847. After spending several months in a camp outside Tehran, and before the Báb could meet the Shah, the Prime Minister sent the Báb to Tabriz in the northwestern corner of the country, to his confinement.

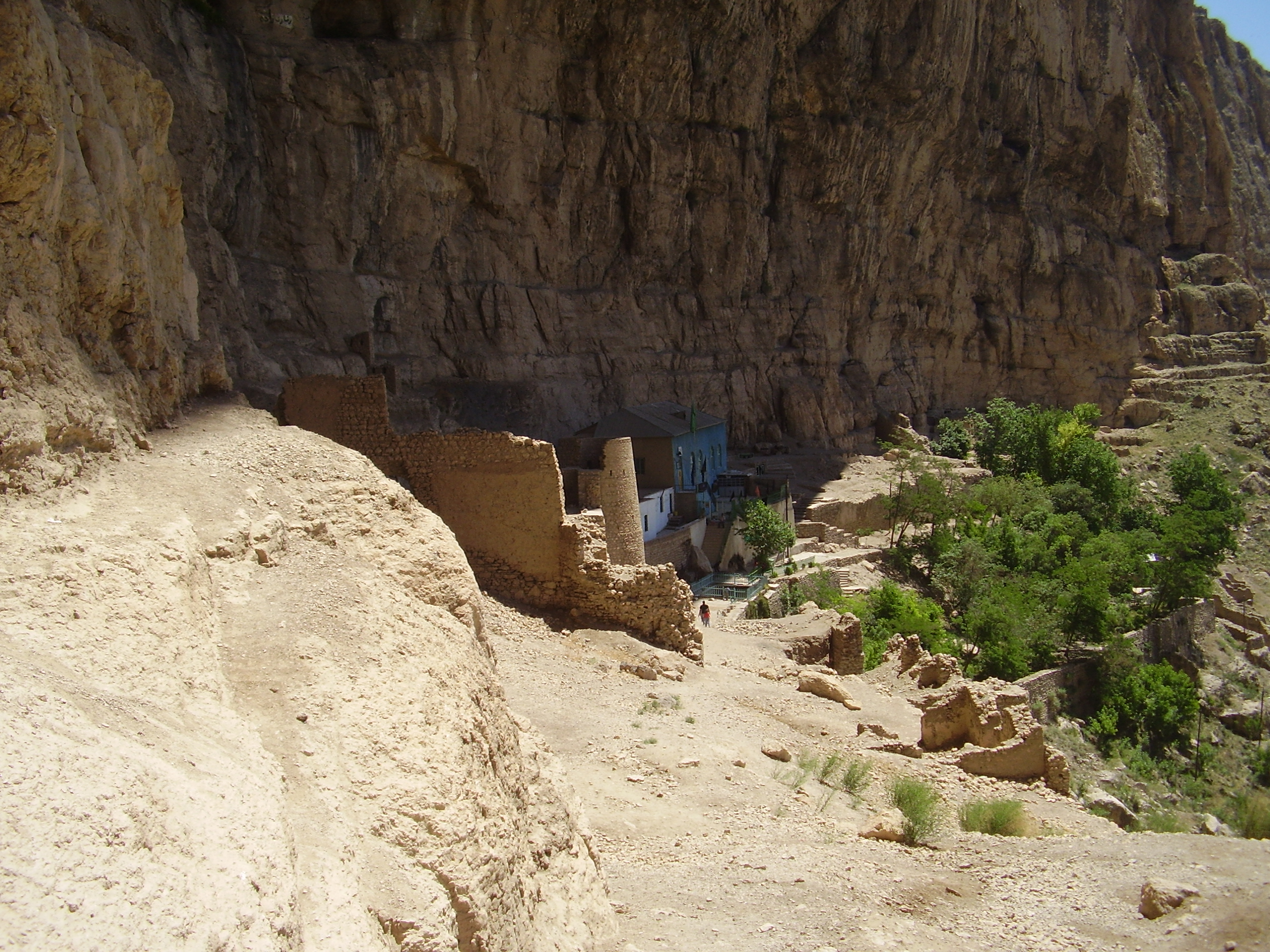
Fortress of Maku, Iran (2008)

After 40 days in Tabriz, the Báb transferred to the fortress of Maku, Iran in the province of Azerbaijan near the Turkish border. During his incarceration there, the Báb began his most important work, the Persian Bayán, that remained unfinished. Because of the Báb's growing popularity in Maku, even the governor of Maku converting, the prime minister transferred him to the fortress of Chihríq in April 1848. There too the Báb's popularity grew, and his jailors relaxed restrictions on him.

== Trial in Tabríz ==
In June 1848, the Báb was brought from Chihríq to Tabríz to face trial for apostasy in front of a body of Islamic clergy. On the way, he spent 10 days in the town of Urmia, where the only known portrait of him was made, a copy of which was later sent to Baháʼu'lláh and is still held in the International Archives at the Baháʼí World Centre.

The trial, attended by the Crown Prince, occurred in July 1848 and involved numerous local clergy. They questioned the Báb about the nature of his claims and his teachings, and demanded that he produce miracles to prove his divine authority. They admonished him to recant his claims. There are nine extant eyewitness reports of the trial, of which several may originate from an earlier source. Six of the reports are from Muslim accounts and portray the Báb in an unfavorable light. There are 62 questions found in the nine sources, however eighteen occur in one source, fifteen in two, eight in three, five in four, thirteen in five, and three in six. Not including "yes" and "he did not answer", only thirty-five answers remain, of which ten occur in one source, eight in two, six in three, three in four, two in five, five in six. Only one answer is found in all nine eyewitness sources, where the Báb states that "I am that person you have been awaiting for one thousand years."

The trial did not bring a decisive result. Some clergy called for capital punishment, but the government pressured them to issue a lenient judgement because the Báb was popular. The government asked medical experts to declare the Báb insane to prevent his execution. It is also likely that the government as a face-saving measure and to appease the religious clergy may have spread rumours that the Báb recanted.

The Shaykh al-Islām, a champion of the anti-Bábist campaign, not at the Báb's trial, issued a conditional death sentence if the Báb was found to be sane. A fatwa was issued establishing the Báb's apostasy and stated, "The repentance of an incorrigible apostate is not accepted, and the only thing which has caused the postponement of thy execution is a doubt as to thy sanity of mind."

The crown prince's physician, William Cormick, examined the Báb and complied with the government's request to find grounds for clemency. The physician's opinion saved the Báb from execution for a time, but the clergy insisted that he face corporal punishment instead, so the Báb suffered foot whipping – 20 lashes to the bottoms of his feet.

The unsigned and undated official government report states that because of his harsh beating, the Báb orally and in writing recanted, apologized, and stated that he would not continue to advance claims of divinity. The document of his alleged recantation was written shortly after his trial in Tabriz. Some authors theorise that the assertions were made to embarrass the Báb and undermine his credibility with the public, and that the language of this document is very different from the Báb's usual style, and so prepared by the authorities.

Orientalist Edward Granville Browne received copies of the trial documents from Hippolyte Dreyfus-Barney, the first French Baha'i. A facsimile of the recantation is published in Browne's Materials for the Study of the Babi Religion, where he states, "[The document], unsigned and undated, was claimed to be in the Báb's handwriting and consists of a complete recantation and renunciation of any superhuman claim which he may have advanced or have appeared to advance. There is nothing to show to whom it is addressed, or whether it is the recantation referred to in the last paragraph of the [government report] or another. The handwriting, though graceful, is not easily legible..." But Amanat considers the document, which has no signature and date, to be fabricated. According to Amanat the document does not match the writing style of the Báb and was forged by the government officials of Tabriz to discredit him and please the Shah. Amanat believes that in the best scenario, the document may have been prepared by the government officials, but the Báb refused to sign it. He stood his ground despite great pressure to recant and gain his freedom. Consequently, he was executed by a firing squad in public in Tabriz to crush the Bábí movement and to display the restored power of the Qajar government under the new minister, Amir Kabir.

After the trial, the Báb was ordered back to the fortress of Chehríq.

=== Proclamation ===
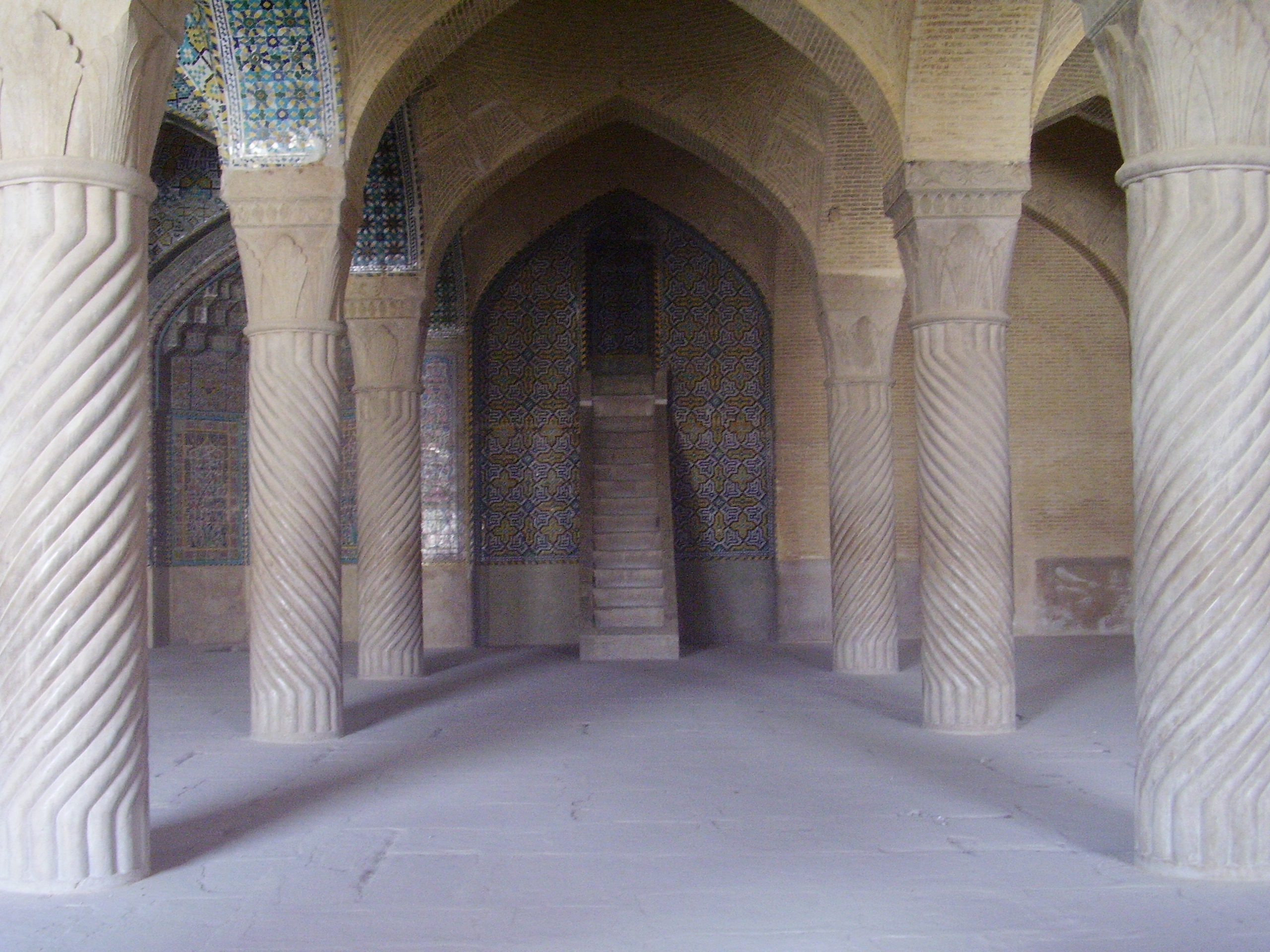
The Báb stood on this pulpit in the Masjid-i-Vakíl, addressing the populace of Shiraz in September 1846.

In his early writings (1844–1847), the Báb appears to identify himself as a gate (báb), a reference to the Four Deputies of the Hidden Imam, the last of whom went into occultation in 941 CE. In his later writings, the Báb more explicitly proclaimed his station as that of the Hidden Imam and a new messenger from God.

The nature of the Báb's different claims and how they were understood to various groups is complicated. Detractors argue that the changing claims represent the Báb's own changing aspirations, while supporters describe the issue as a prudent and gradual disclosure of a coherent identity. For example, the Báb's first writing was designed in the same style as the Qur'an, something that would have been easily recognized at the time as a claim to revelation. Saiedi writes:

His early writings prior to His exile to Maku are ambiguous about His real claim in order to prepare the people for the subsequent unveiling of His true station.

According to Manuchehri, the approach of laying claim to a lower position was intended to create a sense of anticipation for the appearance of the Hidden Imam, as well to avoid persecution and imprisonment, because a public proclamation of mahdi status could bring a swift penalty of death. In the early months of his public declarations, the adoption of a cautious policy had essentially achieved maximum attention with minimum controversy.

The gradual unfolding of claims caused some confusion, both among the public and for some of his followers. Some early believers saw him as a messenger from God with divine authority, and this resulted in disagreement within the Bábí community. Even though the Báb had intended to convey his message with discretion, many of his followers such as Táhirih openly declared the coming of the promised Hidden Imam and Mahdi.

The Qayyūm al-asmā, the first major work of the Báb, identifies its author as a Messenger of God, in the line of Moses, Jesus, Muhammad and those who had preceded them. This commentary is addressed to the whole of humankind, with many references to the peoples of the earth, and of the rulers of East and West, inviting them to accept a new, "wondrous" Cause of spiritual and social renewal. In many places in this commentary, Sayyid Ali Muhammad referred to himself by the traditional Muslim title "Báb" (Gate) although it was apparent from the context that he intended by this term a spiritual claim very different from any which had previously been associated with it. At one level, his use of the title "Gate" was designed to lessen the challenging impact of his claim to be an independent Messenger of God, while at another, for those who grasped the implications of his claims, this title pointed to his role as the forerunner or "Gate of Ba" – a reference to Baha'u'llah, the promised universal messenger anticipated by the world's major scriptures. (Note: The statement made by the Báb in first disclosing his claim to Mulla Husyan describes himself not only as the Messenger of God, but especially as the "Remembrance of God" and the "Proof of God" which unequivocally referred to the long-expected Hidden Imam.)

The incarceration of the Báb in Mákú marked a pivotal moment in his life and mission. During his nine months of imprisonment, he openly declared his station as the promised Qá'im (Hidden Imam) and abrogated the social laws of Islam. The Báb explained that earlier in his ministry, out of compassion, he adhered to the Qur'anic laws to ease the transition for people and avoid unsettling them with a new revelation. He deliberately veiled his true identity to ensure his message could be gradually understood by the masses. Even his title, Báb ("the Gate") was chosen to moderate the impact of his claim as a manifestation of God. He said:

Consider the manifold favours vouchsafed by the Promised One, and the effusions of His bounty which have pervaded the concourse of the followers of Islam to enable them to attain unto salvation. Indeed observe how He Who representeth the origin of creation, He Who is the Exponent of the verse, 'I, in very truth, am God', identified Himself as the Gate (Báb) for the advent of the promised Qá'im, a descendant of Muḥammad, and in His first Book enjoined the observance of the laws of the Qur'án, so that the people might not be seized with perturbation by reason of a new Book and a new Revelation and might regard His Faith as similar to their own, perchance they would not turn away from the Truth and ignore the thing for which they had been called into being.

== Execution ==
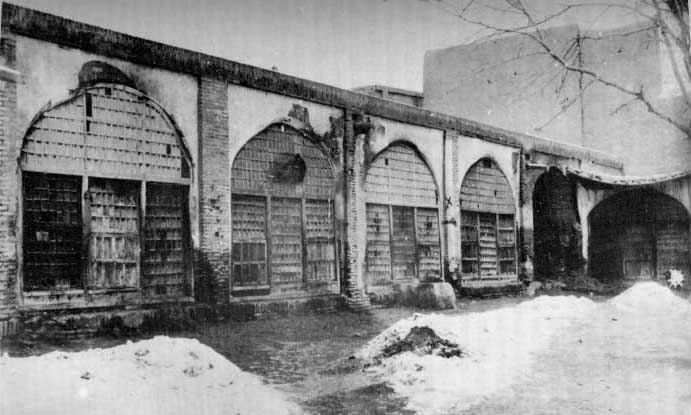
The barrack square in Tabriz, where the Báb was executed.

In mid-1850 a new prime minister, Amir Kabir, ordered the execution of the Báb, probably because of various Bábí insurrections' defeats and because the movement's popularity appeared to be waning. The Báb was brought back to Tabriz from Chehriq for an execution by firing squad. The night before his execution, while being conducted to his cell, a young Bábí, Muhammad-Ali (Anis) from Zonuz, begged for martyrdom with him, then was immediately arrested and placed in the same cell as the Báb.

On the morning of 9 July 1850 (28 Sha'ban 1266 AH), the Báb was taken to the courtyard of the barracks where he was imprisoned. Thousands of people gathered to watch his execution. The Báb and Anis were suspended on a wall and a firing squad of soldiers prepared to shoot. Numerous eye-witness reports, including those of Western diplomats, recount the result. (Note: Sir Justin Shiel, Queen Victoria's Envoy Extraordinary and Minister Plenipotentiary in Tehran, wrote to Henry John Temple, 3rd Viscount Palmerston, the British Secretary of State for Foreign Affairs, on 22 July 1850, regarding the execution. The letter, is found in its original form as document F.O. 60/152/88 in the archives of the Foreign Office at the Public Records Office in London.) The order was given to fire. Accounts differ on the details, but all agree that the first volley failed to kill the Báb; the bullets had instead cut the rope suspending them from the wall. (Note: Some accounts say Anís succumbed to death on the first volley, another that the Báb was dispatched by a sword. See Firuz Kazemzadeh, Kazem Kazemzadeh, and Howard Garey, "The Báb: Accounts of His Martyrdom", in World Order, vol. 8, no. 1 (Fall, 1973), 32. All accounts, even the Muslim ones, concur that the Báb survived the first volley.) A second firing squad was brought in and a second order to fire given. This time the Báb was killed. In Bábí and Baháʼí tradition, the failure of the first volley to kill the Báb is believed to be a miracle. The remains of the Báb and Anis were thrown into a ditch and assumed eaten by dogs, an action condemned by Justin Sheil, then British Minister in Tehran.

The remains were clandestinely rescued by a handful of Bábís and then hidden. Over time the remains were secretly transported according to the instructions of Baháʼu'lláh and then ʿAbdu'l-Bahá by way of Isfahan, Kirmanshah, Baghdad, Damascus, Beirut, and then by sea to Acre on the plain below Mount Carmel in 1899. On 21 March 1909, the remains were interred in a special tomb, the Shrine of the Báb, erected for this purpose by ʻAbdu'l-Bahá, on Mount Carmel in present-day Haifa, Israel. In its vicinity, the Baháʼí World Centre welcomes visitors to tour the gardens.

== Teachings and legacy ==
At the heart of the teachings of the Báb was a call for the reconciliation of all members of the human family, marking the advent of a new stage in human history: "be as the leaves and fruit of the same tree, that haply ye may become a source of comfort to one another... It behooveth you all to be one indivisible people...". A universal ethical perspective was thus emphasized by the Báb, including the moral imperative of making no distinction between believers and nonbelievers and of recognizing the objective needs of others. The intent of these teachings was to lay the basis "for the revolutionary transformation of humankind."

Ultimately, the Báb explained that human happiness and well-being was dependent on treating other human beings in accord with the Golden Rule, especially refraining from causing others sadness, and in bringing all things, whether in nature or man-made, to a state of perfection, a process of imbuing all things with beauty and spiritual purpose. In this way, civilization itself becomes a sacred undertaking; a task that can only be understood, the Báb indicates, by fixing one's "gaze on the Order of Baha'u'llah." As underscored by Saiedi, "the wider importance of the Báb's writings lie in their inextricable relation to those of Baha'u'llah..."

The teachings of the Báb offer new interpretations of the notions of God, religion, and prophets, and reinterpret religious concepts such as heaven, hell, and resurrection accordingly. Progressive revelation, continuity, and renewal of religion, modernizing education, improving the status of women, abolishing the priesthood, and emphasizing ethics, independent investigation of truth, and human nobility are among the key teachings of the Báb. Another fundamental focus of his teachings is his emphasis on the advent of a messianic figure, whom he frequently refers to as "he whom God shall make manifest." The Báb consistently discusses his own revelation and laws in the context of this promised figure. Unlike previous religions where references to promised figures were only occasional and hinted at through allusions, the main focus of the Bayan, the mother book of the Bábí dispensation, is preparing the way for "he whom God shall make manifest."

=== Key Principles ===
A core Bábí belief is the concept of continuous and evolving religion. God progressively reveals himself through prophets, and as humanity advances, divine teachings become more comprehensive and sophisticated. Each religion arises in response to the specific social needs of its time, surpassing its predecessor but ultimately leading to the emergence of a still more perfect religion. These prophets are seen as perfect reflections of God in the world. He emphasizes the unity of prophets, comparing them to mirrors reflecting the same sun (God). Additionally, the Báb asserts that divine revelation is an ongoing process, with new prophets appearing throughout history.

The Báb reinterprets resurrection not as the end of the world but as the decline of an old religion and its revival through a new revelation. He uses the metaphor of seasons to explain this cyclical progression. He argues that just as a tree dies in winter but reemerges in spring, so too do religions experience periods of decline and renewal. This concept embraces historical change and human agency, promoting a forward-looking perspective.

The Báb views religion as a dynamic phenomenon resulting from the interaction between God's will and humanity's historical stage. He rejects the traditional view of religion as an absolute and unchanging imposition of God's will. Religion, like humanity, is a dynamic and progressive reality.

Unlike earlier religions with occasional hints of future prophets, the Bábí scripture, the Bayan, revolves around a messianic figure greater than himself, referred to as "He Whom God Shall Make Manifest." The Báb positions his own mission as preparing the way for this promised one. This figure is described as possessing all divine attributes and having authority equal to God's. The Báb encourages independent investigation to recognize the promised one based on their character and actions, not external factors. He warns against rejecting the promised one based on the Bábí scriptures, mirroring how past religions opposed new prophets.

The Báb emphasizes the inherent capacity of humans to think critically and engage in independent investigation of truth. He abolishes the clergy and emphasizes the words of revelation, not miracles, as the true test of a prophet's legitimacy. He removes the power structure of priests and prohibits congregational prayer led by clerics, arguing that worship requires no human mediation. He views the clergy as a major cause of religious corruption.

The Báb strongly advocates for rationality, science, and efficient education. He envisions a progressive society built on well-organized schools, teaching ethics, respect for diverse opinions, scientific inquiry, and the role of women in society. He encourages the learning of natural sciences and proposes educational reforms like eliminating archaic topics and using simpler language.

The Bábí faith significantly improved the lives of women compared to prevailing norms. He generally treats women and men equally in his laws, alleviating burdens imposed by Islamic law. He discourages polygamy, forbids forced marriage and concubinage, and grants women greater control over their lives. He encourages women's education and sees them as equals to men in the eyes of God. His support for Táhirih, a leading female disciple who challenged social norms, further exemplifies his commitment to improving women's rights.

The Báb emphasizes forgiveness, kindness, and doing good to others, even those who wrong you. He advocates for personal improvement, environmental preservation, and creating a beautiful and prosperous society. He forbids violence and promotes peaceful coexistence through kindness and gentle manners. Overall, the Báb envisioned a community centered on unity, love, service, and the rejection of violence.

=== Succession ===
Because of the prominent social position of Bahá'u'lláh, a leading Bábi figure of the time, and that a death warrant had already been once issued against him (by Mohammad Shah shortly before the king's death), great care was taken to avoid putting him in the spotlight. Even the Báb's letters to Bahá'u'lláh came in the name of his younger brother Mírzá Yahyá. The danger that threatened Bahá'u'lláh was from Amir Kabir. According to Saiedi, if Amir Kabir knew about the key role that Bahá'u'lláh was playing in the Bábí community, he would have him executed. Bahá'u'lláh, Mírzá Yahyá and one of the Báb's secretaries had reached an agreement that in order to protect Bahá'u'lláh, the younger brother would be recognized as the figurehead of the Bábí community and would be kept in hiding out of harm's way. This would leave Bahá'u'lláh freer to continue his activities as a leading Bábí. Accordingly, the Báb sent a letter to Mírzá Yahyá naming him to nominal leadership pending the imminent appearance of the Promised One, commonly referred to as 'Him Whom God shall make manifest' by the Báb. At the time Mírzá Yahyá, still a teenager, had never demonstrated leadership in the Bábí movement, and was still living in the house of his older brother, Baháʼu'lláh. According to Amanat, it seems very unlikely that Mírzá Yahyá, a young man who was no more than 18 years old in could have been directly the focus of the Báb's attention, especially in the situation where the Báb was prohibited from communicating with his followers in the prisons of Maku and Chihriq. MacEoin believes that this idea that Yahyá was only named a nominal head until the appearance of Bahá'u'lláh, from whom he was supposed to divert away attention is a popular explanation among Baháʼís, despite obvious ethical concerns.

Unlike earlier religions in which references to future promised figures were occasional and only in hints and allusions, the entirety of the Bayan, the mother book of the Bábí dispensation, is essentially a discourse on a messianic figure, even greater than himself, that the Báb refers to as "he whom God shall make manifest". The Báb always discusses his own revelation and laws in the context of this promised figure. The essence and purpose of the Báb's own mission, as he always stressed, was to prepare the people for the advent of him. The Báb describes this messianic figure as the origin of all divine attributes, and states that his command is equivalent to God's command. He asks his followers to independently investigate and look for the promised one, and recognize him out of his own intrinsic reality, works and attributes, and not due to any reasons external to him. He even warns them not to be deprived of the promised one by arguing against him from the works of the Báb, the same way the followers of the previous religions opposed the next prophet while citing their holy scriptures, a theme he repeatedly stressed throughout the Bayán. Furthermore, the Báb speaks of the imminence of the advent of the promised one and refers to the time of his advent as year nine and nineteen.

In 1863, nineteen years after the Báb declared his mission, Baha'u'llah, in the company of his companions in Iraq, and later in 1866 in Edirne, in a more publicized manner, claimed to be this figure promised by the Báb. Most of the Bábí community accepted him and later became known as Baha'is.

For a small group of Bábís who did not recognize Baháʼu'lláh, Mírzá Yahyá remained their leader until his death in 1912, with these followers becoming known as Azalis or Azali Bábís. Mírzá Yahyá was reclusive and did not maintain close contact with his followers in Iran. Azali successorship remains disputed. Baháʼí sources report that 11 of the 18 "witnesses" appointed by Mírzá Yahyá to oversee the Bábí community became Baháʼís, as his son did. The man allegedly appointed by Mírzá Yahyá to succeed him, Hadí Dawlat-Abádí, later publicly recanted his faith in the Báb and Mírzá Yahyá. Today Baháʼís have several million followers, while estimates of the number of Azalís are generally around one thousand in Iran, and any organization of theirs seems to have ceased to exist.

While many academic sources concur that Mírzá Yahyá served as the nominal head of the Bábí community for a brief period—his leadership being largely ineffective due to his seclusion and the presence of multiple Babi claimants to spiritual authority—and that his appointment was primarily intended to divert attention from Bahá'u'lláh, a minority perspective, expressed by MacEoin, holds that the Báb explicitly designated Mírzá Yahyá as the custodian of his writings and a channel for divine revelation and that after the Báb's death and the exile to Baghdad, most Bábís recognized Subh-i-Azal as their spiritual leader. Mac Eoin is criticized for his 'uncritical' use of Azali primary sources. In Baghdad, Bahá'u'lláh began to overshadow Subh-i-Azal as the leading figure among the remaining Bábís. For his own safety, Subh-i-Azal chose to remain in hiding, relying on Bahá'u'lláh, his full brother Mírzá Músá, and their families for material support. In contrast, Bahá'u'lláh was outgoing, authoritative, and accessible. Increasingly, more Bábís began to view him as a spiritual leader in his own right and as the central figure of their devotion. Subh-i-Azal was unable to offer effective leadership and continued to promote a policy of militancy, even going so far as to orchestrate the murder of some prominent Bábís.

=== Commemorations in the Baháʼí Faith ===
In the Baháʼí calendar the events of the birth, declaration and death of the Báb are commemorated by Baháʼí communities on a yearly basis. At the centennial of the declaration of the Báb to Mulla Husayn in May 1944, the Baháʼís had a viewing of the portrait of the Báb during the celebrations held at the Baháʼí House of Worship (Wilmette, Illinois). Speaking at the event were Dorothy Beecher Baker, Horace Holley, and others.

The notion of "twin Manifestations of God" is a concept fundamental to Baháʼí belief, describing the relationship between the Báb and Baháʼu'lláh. Both are considered Manifestations of God in their own right, having each founded separate religions (Bábism and the Baháʼí Faith) and revealed their own holy scriptures, but seen to be forming one inseparable continuity. To Baháʼís the missions of the Báb and Baháʼu'lláh are inextricably linked: The Báb's mission was to prepare the way for the coming of Him whom God shall make manifest, who eventually appeared in the person of Baháʼu'lláh. Both the Báb and Baháʼu'lláh are revered as central figures of the Baháʼí Faith. A parallel is made between Baháʼu'lláh and the Báb as between Jesus and John the Baptist, although the exceptional occurrence of having two Manifestations of God for one era is underscored.

=== Impact ===
'Abdu'l Baha summarises the Báb's impact: "Alone, He undertook a task that can scarcely be conceived... This illustrious Being arose with such power as to shake the foundations of the religious laws, customs, manners, morals, and habits of Persia, and instituted a new law, faith, and religion."

The Bábí movement had a major impact on religious and social thought in 19th century Iran. Christopher de Bellaigue, writing about the Enlightenment period in the Islamic world, wrote:

The Babi movement, which began in the 1840s, went on to become an important catalyst of social progressiveness in mid-nineteenth-century Iran, promoting interreligious peace, social equality between the sexes and revolutionary anti-monarchism... it went on to present a vision of modernity that was based on secularism, internationalism, and the rejection of war. It is this vision which has enabled it to survive to the present day – as Bahá'ísm – in pockets and communities peopled by five million souls, and which qualifies it for inclusion in any narrative about modernisation in the Middle East.

== Writings ==
Cover for the book Selections from the Writings of the Báb

The Báb affirms that the verses revealed by a Manifestation of God are the greatest proof of his mission and the writings of the Báb comprise over two thousand tablets, epistles, prayers, and philosophical treatises. Most works were revealed in response to specific questions by Bábís. Sometimes the Báb revealed works very rapidly by chanting them in the presence of a secretary and eyewitnesses. These writings form part of Bahá'í scripture, particularly his prayers, which are often recited individually as well as in devotional gatherings. The works of the Báb have also excited scholarly interest and analysis. Elham Afnan describes the writings of the Báb as having "restructured the thoughts of their readers, so that they could break free from the chains of obsolete beliefs and inherited customs". Jack McLean notes the novel symbolism of the Báb's works, observing that "The universe of the Báb's sacred writings is pervasively symbolic. Numbers, colors, minerals, liquids, the human body, social relationships, gestures, deeds, language (letters and words), and nature itself are all mirrors or signs that reflect the profounder reality of the names and attributes (asmá va sifát) of God". The Báb's works are characterised by linguistic innovation, including many neologisms whenever he found existing theological terms inadequate. Free association and stream-of-consciousness-style composition are marked features of some works. Several scholars have identified the continual repetition of particular words or phrases of religious importance to be a distinct feature throughout the Báb's writings. The Báb himself categorised his writings into five modes: divine verses, prayers, commentaries, rational discourse—written in Arabic—and the Persian mode, which encompasses the previous four. Scholars have noted commonalities between the Báb's writings and those of Western philosophers such as Hegel, Kant and James Joyce.

Most of the writings of the Báb have been lost, however. The Báb himself stated they exceeded five hundred thousand verses in length; the Quran, in contrast, is 6300 verses in length. If one assumes 25 verses per page, that would equal 20,000 pages of text. Nabíl-i-Zarandí, in The Dawn-breakers, mentions nine complete commentaries on the Quran, revealed during the Báb's imprisonment at Maku, which have been lost without a trace. Establishing the true text of the works that are still extant, as already noted, is not always easy, and some texts will require considerable work. Others, however, are in good shape; several of the Báb's major works are available in the handwriting of his trusted secretaries.

The Archives Department at the Baháʼí World Centre currently holds about 190 Tablets of the Báb. Excerpts from several principal works have been published in the only English-language compilation of the Báb's writings: Selections from the Writings of the Báb. Denis MacEoin, in his Sources for Early Bábī Doctrine and History, gives a description of many works; much of the following summary is derived from that source. In addition to major works, the Báb revealed numerous letters to his wife and followers, many prayers for various purposes, numerous commentaries on verses or chapters of the Quran, and many khutbihs or sermons (most of which were never delivered). Many of these have been lost; others have survived in compilations.

The Báb has been criticized for his inconsistent use of correct and incorrect Arabic grammar in his religious works, though in his Arabic letters he made very few mistakes. A reason for this inconsistency could be to distinguish those who could not see past the outer form of the words from those that could understand the deeper meaning of his message. The Báb in his Treatise on Grammar, emphasised that Arabic grammar must be taught as an outer symbol of the spiritual grammar of the universe.

=== Three Stages ===
The writings of the Báb have been described in terms of different typologies, including chronologically and thematically. The Báb himself divides his writings into two stages: the first stage, where for purposes of preparation and prudence, the subtleties of his claims and teachings were veiled and consequently not appreciated by the hearts and minds of the people around him; and a later stage, where he openly declared that he was not only the promised Twelfth Imam of Shiah Islam, but a Prophet who has brought a new world religion, prophesied by Torah, Gospel and the Quran. This new revelation, he claimed, would release the creative energies and capacities necessary for the establishment of global unity and peace.

The Báb's teachings can be further understood as having three broad stages, each with a dominant thematic focus. His earliest teachings are primarily defined by his interpretation of the Quran and hadith, which recast common understandings of theological belief in light of a new hermenutics emphasizing the unity of God and his prophets and of all people. Rather than revealing new religious laws, early Bábí doctrine "focuses on the inner and mystical meanings of religious law" and "turning ritual action into a spiritual journey" These themes continue in later years, but a shift takes place where his emphasis moves to philosophical elucidation, and finally to legislative pronouncements.

In the second philosophical stage, the Báb gives an explanation of the metaphysics of being and creation, and in the third legislative stage his mystical and historical principles unite as the Báb's writings gain a historical consciousness. and clearly establish the principle of Progressive Revelation.

The Báb discusses many fundamental issues in religion in this second stage including how to recognize spiritual truth, the nature of the human being, the meaning of faith, the nature of good deeds, the preconditions of spiritual journey and the question of the eternality or origination of the world. The realization of "true justice" in the world, and the central role of religion in attaining such justice, is another major focus of this stage. He even, in his Treatise on Singing, explores the philosophy of music, "where like every other human action, singing becomes moral or immoral depending on the intention of the actor and the function of the act."

The last of the three stages in the Báb's writings is described by Saiedi as a legislatives phase spanning the Báb's imprisonment at Mákú and Chihríq from April 1847 until his execution in July 1850. In works from this period, the Báb's claims are presented as abrogating Islamic law, inaugurating a new religious dispensation, and portraying him as a Manifestation of God who fulfills the expected return of earlier prophets. Saiedi further interprets the Báb as rejecting a conception of religion as the perpetual imposition of divine will, instead viewing it as the “product of the interaction of the will of God with the historical stage of the development of humanity.” According to Ghaemmaghami, in June 1848, a number of the Báb’s followers gathered at the Conference of Badasht in northern Iran, under the direction of Baháʼuʼlláh, with the aim of implementing the Bayán through a sudden and complete break with the previous religious order, including Islamic law; later accounts associate this meeting with Ṭáhirih’s public unveiling before the assembled Bábís. The Persian Bayan, the principal scriptural work of the Báb during this period, openly proclaims the inception of a new religion. As human understanding and action undergoes change, so too is religion an unfolding and progressive phenomenon. The Báb's legal system included details for marriage, burial, pilgrimage, prayer, and other practices that appear designed for a future Bábí state or to be implemented by He whom God shall make manifest, the promised universal messenger of God who is mentioned throughout the Báb's writings. All these laws were contingent on the approval of "Him Whom God shall make manifest" and thus their importance lied in the spiritual meaning which they symbolized: the recognition of Him Whom God shall make manifest in the next divine revelation.

=== Writings before his declaration ===
The Báb's Tafsir on Surah al-Baqara was started by the Báb in November or December 1843, some six months before declaring his mission. The first half was completed by February or March 1844; the second half was revealed after the Báb's declaration. It is the only work of the Báb's revealed before his declaration that has survived intact. It also sheds light on the Báb's attitude toward Twelver beliefs. His wife also refers to important episodes before his declaration.

=== Shiraz, May – September 1844 ===
- The first chapter of the Qayyúmu'l-Asmáʼ ("Tafsir on the Surah Yusuf") was written by the Báb on the evening of 22 May 1844 when he made his declaration to Mullá Husayn. The entire work, which is several hundred pages in length and is considered to be revelation by Baháʼís, required forty days to write; it is one of the Báb's longer Arabic works. It was widely distributed in the first year of the Bábí movement, functioning as something of a Quran or Bible for the Bábís. In the book the Báb states his claim to be a Manifestation of God, though the claim is disguised with other statements that he is the servant of the Hidden Imám. Táhirih translated the work into Persian.
- Sahífih-yi-makhzúnih, revealed before his departure for Mecca in September 1844, and consists of a collection of fourteen prayers, mostly to be recited on specific holy days and festivals. Its content remained within the expectations of Islam.

=== Pilgrimage, September 1844 – June 1845 ===
During his 9 1/2-month pilgrimage to Mecca, the Báb composed many works:

- Khasá'il-i-sabʿih: A work composed by the Báb on his sea journey back to Bushehr after his pilgrimage, which listed some regulations to be followed by the Bábí community. A copy of the manuscript probably still exists in Iran.
- Kitáb-i-Rúḥ ("Book of the Spirit"): This book contains 700 or 900 verses and was written while the Báb was sailing back to Bushehr from pilgrimage. The original was nearly destroyed when the Báb was arrested. Several manuscript copies are extant.
- Sahífih baynu'l-haramayn ("Treatise Between the Two Sanctuaries"): This Arabic work was written while the Báb traveled from Mecca to Medina in early 1845 and is in response to questions posed to him by a prominent Shaykhí leader.
- Kitáb-i-Fihrist ("The Book of the Catalogue"): A list of the Báb's works, composed by the Báb himself after he returned from pilgrimage to Mecca, 21 June 1845. It is a bibliography of his earliest writings.

=== Bushehr and Shiraz, March 1845 – September 1846 ===
The Báb was in Bushehr March through June 1845, then in Shiraz.

- Sahífih-yi-Jaʿfariyyih: The Báb wrote this treatise to an unknown correspondent in 1845. Over a hundred pages in length, it states many of his basic teachings, especially in relation to some Shaykhi beliefs.
- Tafsír-i-Súrih-i-Kawthar ("Tafsir on the Surah al-Kawthar"): The Báb wrote this commentary for Yahyá Dárábí Vahíd while he was in Shiraz; it is the most important work revealed during the Shiraz period. Though the surah is only three verses in length, being the shortest in the Quran, the commentary on it is over two hundred pages in length. The work was widely distributed, and at least a dozen early manuscripts are extant.

=== Isfahan, September 1846 – March 1847 ===
- Nubuvvih khássih: This work, of fifty pages' length, was revealed in two hours in response to a question by Governor Manouchehr Khan Gorji. It discusses the special prophethood of Muhammad, an important subject discussed in debates between Muslims and Christians.
- Tafsír-i-Súrih-i-va'l-ʿasr (Commentary on the Surah al-ʿAṣr): This is one of the two important works the Báb penned in Isfahan. It was written spontaneously and publicly in response to a request by Mir Sayyid Muhammad, the chief cleric of the city; much of it was written in one evening, to the astonishment to those present.

=== Maku, late summer 1847 – May 1848 ===
The Báb left Isfahan in March 1847, sojourned outside Tehran several months, then was sent to a fortress at Maku, Iran, close to the Turkish border. It witnessed the composition of some of the Báb's most important works.

- Persian Bayán: This is undoubtedly the most important work of the Báb and contains a mature summary of his teachings. It was composed in Maku in late 1847 or early 1848. The work consists of nine chapters titled váhids or "unities", which in turn are usually subdivided into nineteen bábs or "gates"; the one exception is the last unity, which has only ten bábs. The Báb explained that it would be the task of "He Whom God shall make manifest" to complete the work; Baháʼís believe Baháʼu'lláh's Kitáb-i-Íqán to be the completion of the Bayán. Each unity begins with an Arabic summary of its contents, which makes it easier to read than many of the Báb's works. Extracts of this work are published in Selections from the Writings of the Báb; A. L. M. Nicolas translated the entire work into French in four 150-page volumes.
- Arabic Bayán: This is the shorter and less important of the two Bayáns. It consists of eleven váhids or "unities", each with nineteen bábs or "gates". It offers a succinct summary of the Báb's teachings and laws. It was composed at Maku in late 1847 or early 1848.
- Dalá'il-i-Sab'ih ("Seven Proofs"): There are two works by this name, the longer one in Persian, the shorter one in Arabic; both were composed in Maku in late 1847 or early 1848. Nicolas called the Persian Seven Proofs "the most important of the polemical works that issued from the pen of Sayyid ʿAlí Muhammad". The work was written to either a non-Bábí or to a follower whose faith had been shaken, but the recipient's identity is unknown. The Arabic text summarizes the seven proofs found in the Persian text.

=== C͟hihríq, May 1848 – July 1850 ===
The Báb spent two years in Chihríq, except for his brief visit to Tabriz for his trial. The works he produced there were more esoteric or mystical and less thematically organized. Two major books were produced, in addition to many minor works:

- Kitábu'l-Asmáʼ ("The Book of Names"): This is an extremely long book about the names of God. It was penned during the Báb's last days at Chihríq, before his execution. The various manuscript copies contain numerous variations in the text; the book will require considerable work to reconstruct its original text.
- Kitáb-i-Panj Sha'n ("Book of Five Grades"): Composed in Arabic and Persian, between March and April 1850, just three months prior to his execution, it is one of the Báb's final works. The book consists of eighty-five sections arranged in seventeen groups, each under the heading of a different name of God. Within each group are five "grades", that is, five different sorts of sections: verses, prayers, homilies, commentaries, and revelations in Persian. Each group was sent to a different person and was composed on a different day. Thus the work is a kind of miscellany of unrelated material. Some of the sections represent further exposition of basic themes in the Báb's teachings; others consists of lengthy iterations of the names of God, and variations on their roots.

== See also ==
- List of Mahdi claimants
- List of founders of religious traditions
- Twin Holy Birthdays
