= Persian Bayán =

Principal scriptural text of the Báb

The Persian Bayán (Persian: بیان 'expression') is one of the principal scriptural writings of the Báb, the founder of Bábism, written in Persian. The Báb also wrote a shorter book in Arabic, known as the Arabic Bayán.

== Content ==
The Persian Bayán was written near the end of 1847 or the beginning of 1848, while the Báb was imprisoned in Maku. The book contains elements of Bábí law, discussion of religious concepts, and the glorification of He whom God shall make manifest. It was one of the Báb's first works in which he clearly states that he is the messianic figure of the Twelfth Imam and the Mahdi which the Shiʻas were expecting. Along with claiming this status, he also announced the abrogation of the Islamic dispensation, and uses the new Bábí law to abrogate Islamic law. More than just a book of law for the new religion, the whole book revolves around the praise of the Babi messianic figure 'He whom God shall make manifest', promising the coming of this major prophet known as a Manifestation of God; this would be of major importance with Baháʼu'lláh's claim to be this figure two decades later. Shoghi Effendi considered the work primarily a "eulogy of the Promised One", who had abrogated the laws of Islam while simultaneously prophesying the coming of a successor religion, seen by Baha'is as being the Baháʼí Faith.

== Unities and chapters ==
The book was intended to be composed of nineteen 'unities' each of nineteen chapters, consisting of a total of 361 sections, which had numerical significance, but this was left incomplete and stops in the ninth 'unity'. It was intended to be finished by "He whom God shall make manifest", a messianic figure in the Báb's writings. Baháʼís consider Baháʼu'lláh's Kitáb-i-Íqán as its completion.

== Laws ==
Among the main themes of the Bayán are the mystic character of action, the prohibition of causing grief to others, refinement, perfection and the spiritualization of life and language. Baháʼí scholar, Nader Saiedi states that the severe laws of the Bayán were never meant to be put in practice, because their implementation depended on the appearance of He whom God shall make manifest, while at the same time all of the laws would be abrogated unless the Promised One would reaffirm them. Saiedi concludes that these can then only have a strategic and symbolic meaning, and were meant to break through traditions and to focus the Báb's followers on obedience to He whom God shall make manifest. The Báb stresses the importance of the recognition of the symbolic nature and spiritual meaning of each of his laws. In the Baháʼí view, Baháʼu'lláh is regarded as this Promised One. In his Kitab-i-Aqdas, Baháʼu'lláh cancelled specific laws of the Bayan, while confirming others.

== Right of completion ==
Certain early researchers of the religion believed that the right of completing the Bayán was conferred to Subh-i Azal. Subh-i-Azal did write a book titled Supplement to the Persian Bayán, which contains the portion missing compared to the Arabic Bayán. According to Baháʼí scholars, Subh-i-Azal is only given the right to complete the Bayán with the permission of He whom God shall make manifest, and asked to preserve the religion as a nominal head until He whom God shall make manifest would arrive.

The Báb eliminated any form of successorship or vicegerency from his religion and stated that no one else's writings would be authoritative after his death to the time of He Whom God shall make Manifest. However, some of the followers of Subh-i-Azal maintain that the Báb actually made Subh-i-Azal his vicegerent because the Báb, in a tablet written to Azal, stated that he should manifest the remaining paths of the Bayán if He Whom God shall make Manifest is made manifest during Azal's days. The Azalis interpret this to mean the Báb gave Sub-i-Azal the right to complete the unfinished text of the Bayán. However, the Báb affirms to Subh-i-Azal himself that He Whom God shall make Manifest may appear in Subh-i-Azal's own lifetime, and thus eliminates any viceregency for Subh-i-Azal.

An alternative interpretation of the passage in question is that Subh-i-Azal is asked to instead to making public or distribute the eight copies of the Bayán to eight people mentioned in the passage, rather than granting the right to complete the Bayán.

== Browne and the Bayán ==
Edward G. Browne planned at one time to publish an edited text of the Persian Bayán, and did considerable work on the compilation of six manuscripts, but the work was never completed. This incomplete compilation, still exists in the Cambridge University Library (classmark Or. 1331–7 [11]), awaiting the attention of some future scholar.
