= History of the Baháʼí Faith =

The Baháʼí Faith has its background in two earlier movements in the nineteenth century, Shaykhism and Bábism. Shaykhism centred on theosophical doctrines and many Shaykhis expected the return of the hidden Twelfth Imam. Many Shaykhis joined the messianic Bábí movement in the 1840s where the Báb proclaimed himself to be the return of the hidden Imam. As the Bábí movement spread in Iran, the ruling Shiʿa Muslim government began persecuting the Bábís, which reached its most dramatic moment when government troops massacred many of them at the Battle of Fort Tabarsí in 1849, and executed the Báb in 1850.

The Báb had spoken of another messianic figure, He whom God shall make manifest. As one of the followers of the Báb, Baháʼu'lláh was imprisoned during a subsequent wave of massacre by the Persian government against Bábís in 1852, was exiled to Iraq, and then to Constantinople and Adrianople in the Ottoman Empire. Amidst these banishments, in 1863 in Baghdad, Baháʼu'lláh claimed to be the messianic figure expected by the Báb's writings, and the majority of Bábís eventually became followers of Baháʼu'lláh, thereby being known as Baháʼís.

At the time of Baháʼu'lláh's death, the Baháʼí Faith was mostly confined to the Persian and Ottoman empires, at which time he had followers in thirteen countries of Asia and Africa. Leadership of the religion then passed on to ʻAbdu'l-Bahá, Baháʼu'lláh's son, who was appointed by Baháʼu'lláh in his will and testament, and was accepted by almost all Baháʼís. Under the leadership of ʻAbdu'l-Bahá, the religion gained a footing in Europe and America, and was consolidated in Iran, where it still suffers intense persecution.

After the death of ʻAbdu'l-Bahá in 1921, the leadership of the Baháʼí community was passed on to his grandson, Shoghi Effendi, who was appointed in ʻAbdu'l-Bahá's will. The document appointed Shoghi Effendi as the first Guardian, and called for the election of the Universal House of Justice once the Baháʼí Faith had spread sufficiently for such elections to be meaningful. During Shoghi Effendi's time as leader of the religion there was a great increase in the number of Baháʼís, in particular because of the systematic plans he made for the growth of the Faith to all corners of the world, and he presided over the election of many new National Spiritual Assemblies.

After the sudden passing of the Guardian in 1957, and following the temporary leadership of the global Bahá’í community by the Hands of the Cause, the Universal House of Justice was first elected in 1963, and since that time the Universal House of Justice has been the highest body in the Baháʼí administration, with its members elected every five years. Baháʼí sources and most scholarly works estimate the current worldwide Baháʼí population to be from five to eight million.

== Background ==
=== Islamic messianism ===
In Islam, the Mahdi is a messianic figure who is believed to be a descendant of Muhammad who will return near the end of time to restore the world and the religion of God. While both Sunni and Shiʻa groups believe in the Mahdi, the largest Shiʻa group, the Twelvers, believe that the Mahdi is the Twelfth Imam, Muhammad al-Mahdi, who is believed to have gone into occultation since 874 CE.

In the Twelver view, the Twelfth Imam first went into a "Minor Occultation" between 874 and 941 CE where the Hidden Imam still communicated with the community through four official intermediaries. The "Greater Occultation" is then defined from the time when the Hidden Imam ceased to communicate regularly until the time when he returns to restore the world.

=== Shaykhism ===
The Shaykhi movement was a school of theology within Twelver Shiʻan Islam that was started through the teaching of Shaykh Ahmad al-Ahsá'í (May 1753 ― 27 June 1826). Shaykh Ahmad's teachings included that the Imams were spiritual beings and that, in contrast to the widespread Shiʻa belief, the Imams existed within spiritual bodies, and not material bodies. He also taught that there must always exist the "Perfect Shiʻa" who serves as an intermediary between the Imams and the believers, and is the one who can visualize the consciousness of the Hidden Imam. In 1822 he left Iran and went to Iraq due to the controversy that his teachings had brought. There he also found himself at the centre of debate, thus deciding to move to Mecca, he died in 1826 on his way there.

Before his death, Shaykh Ahmad appointed Siyyid Kázim of Rasht to lead the Shaykhí movement, which he did until his death in 1843. Siyyid Kázim formulated many of the thoughts that were ambiguously expressed by Shaykh Ahmad including the doctrine of salvation history and the cycles of revelation. His teaching brought a sense of millenarian hope among the Shaykhis that the Hidden Imam may return. Siyyid Kazim did not leave a successor, but before his death in December, 1843, he had counselled his followers to leave their homes to seek the Mahdi, who according to his prophecies would soon appear.

=== Bábism ===
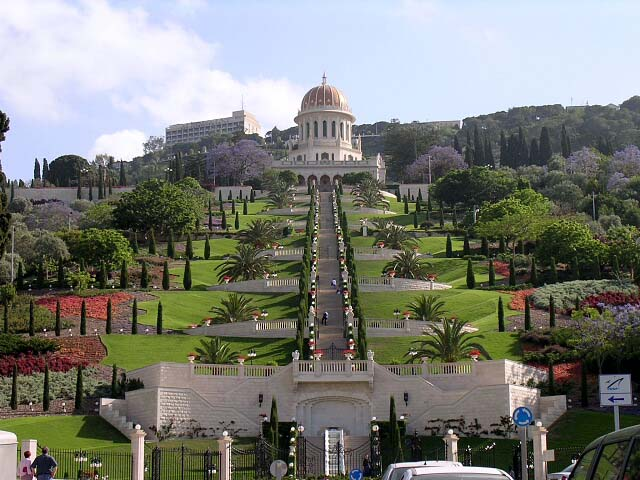
Shrine of the Báb in Haifa, Israel

Siyyid ʻAlí-Muhammad, who later took on the title the Báb, was born on October 20, 1819, in Shiraz to a merchant of the city; his father died while he was quite young and the boy was raised by his maternal uncle Ḥájí Mírzá Siyyid ʻAlí, who was also a merchant.

In May 1844 the Báb proclaimed to Mulla Husayn, one of the Shaykhis, to be the one whose coming was prophesied by Shaykh Ahmad and Siyyid Kázim and the bearer of divine knowledge. Within five months, seventeen other disciples of Siyyid Káẓim had recognized the Báb as a Manifestation of God. These eighteen disciples were later known as the Letters of the Living and were given the task of spreading the new faith across Iran and Iraq. The Báb initially attracted most of the followers of the Shaykhí movement, but soon his teachings went far beyond those roots and attracted prominent followers across Iran. His followers were known as Bábís.

The first accounts in the West of events related to the history of the Báb and his followers appears January 8, 1845, as an exchange of diplomatic reports not published in the newspapers. This was an account of the first Letter of the Living to be dispatched from the presence of the Báb – the second Letter of the Living and first Babi martyr, Mullá ʻAlí-i-Bastámí. The British diplomat who recorded these events was Sir Henry Rawlinson, 1st Baronet who wrote first to Stratford Canning, 1st Viscount Stratford de Redcliffe, then Ambassador to Istanbul, and it included an enclosure from the Governor of Kirmánsháh protesting the arrest in Ottoman lands of a Persian mullá. Follow-up exchanges continued from January into April where diplomatic records of events end. Ottoman state archives affirm his arrival in Istanbul where he is then sentenced to serve in the naval ship yards at hard labor – the Ottoman ruler refusing to banish him as it would be "difficult to control his activities and prevent him spreading his false ideas." The first public account was published Nov 1, 1845, in the London Times. It was centered on events in Shiraz when the last Letter of the Living, Quddús returned after traveling with the Báb. The story was also carried from Nov 15 by the Literary Gazette which was subsequently echoed widely in other countries.

After some time, preaching by the Letters of the Living led to opposition by the Islamic clergy, prompting the Governor of Shiraz to order the Báb's arrest. After being under house arrest in Shiraz from June 1845 to September 1846, the Báb spent several months in Isfahan debating clergy, many of whom became sympathetic. Among the most unexpected of those who embraced the Cause of the Báb was a brilliant theologian who bore the title of Vahid—meaning “unique”. A trusted advisor to the Shah, Vahid had been sent to interrogate the Báb on behalf of the king, who wished to secure reliable firsthand information about the movement that was sweeping his land. Upon learning of Vahid's conversion, the Shah called for the Báb to be brought to Tehran. The Prime Minister—fearing that his own position might be fatally undermined should the Shah also fall under the Báb’s influence—halted the Báb’s escort outside Tehran, then ordered instead that he be imprisoned in the remote fortress of Máh-Kú, near the Turkish border. The excuse given to the Shah was that the Báb’s arrival in the capital might lead to great public distress and disorder.

During the Báb’s incarceration in the fortress of Máh-Kú in the province of Azarbaijan close to the Turkish border, he began his most important work, the Persian Bayán, which he never finished. He was then transferred to the fortress of Chihríq in April 1848. In that place as well, the Báb's popularity grew and his jailors relaxed restrictions on him. Hence the Prime Minister ordered the Báb back to Tabriz where the government called on religious authorities to put the Báb on trial for blasphemy and apostasy. Bábism was also spreading across the country, and the Islamic government saw it as a threat to state religion, even going so far as to send military forces against the Bábís in 1849. Communities of Bábís established themselves in Iran and Iraq, and in 1850 reached several cities of Azarbaijan. Coverage in newspapers in the West reoccurred in 1849 including in the French journal Revue de l'Orient. In the fall of 1850 newspaper coverage fell behind quickly unfolding events. Though the Báb was named for the first time he had in fact already been executed.

In mid-1850 a new prime minister, Amir Kabir, ordered the execution of the Báb, probably because various Bábí insurrections had been defeated and the movement's popularity appeared to be waning. The Báb was brought back to Tabríz from Chihríq, so that he could be shot by a firing squad. On the morning of July 9, 1850, the Báb was taken to the courtyard of the barracks in which he was being held, where thousands of people had gathered to watch. The Báb and a companion (a young man named Anis) were suspended on a wall and a large firing squad prepared to shoot. After the order was given to shoot and the smoke cleared, the Báb was no longer in the courtyard and Anis stood there unharmed; the bullets apparently had not harmed either man, but had cut the rope suspending them from the wall. (Note: Sir Justin Shiel, Queen Victoria's Envoy Extraordinary and Minister Plenipotentiary in Tehran, wrote to Lord Palmerston, the British Secretary of State for Foreign Affairs, on July 22, 1850, regarding the execution. The letter, can be found in its original form as document F.O. 60/152/88 in the archives of the Foreign Office at the Public Records Office in London.) The soldiers subsequently found the Báb in another part of the barracks, completely unharmed. He was tied up for execution a second time, a second firing squad was ranged in front of them, and a second order to fire was given. This time, the Báb and his companion were killed. Their remains were dumped outside the gates of the town to be eaten by animals.

The remains, however, were rescued by a handful of Bábis and were hidden. Over time the remains were secretly transported by way of Isfahan, Kermanshah, Baghdad and Damascus, to Beirut and thence by sea to Acre in Palestine, on the plain below Mount Carmel in 1899. In 1909, the remains were finally interred in a special tomb, erected for this purpose by ʻAbdu'l-Bahá, on Mount Carmel in the Holy Land in Haifa, Palestine. The Shrine of the Báb remains an important place of pilgrimage for Baháʼís. The Shrine is a protected site and in 2008 was listed on UNESCO's World Heritage Sites.

While the Báb claimed a station of revelation, he also claimed no finality for his revelation. A constant theme in his works, especially the Persian Bayan was that of the great Promised One, the next embodiment of the Primal Will, whom the Báb termed He whom God shall make manifest, promised in the sacred writings of previous religions would soon establish the Kingdom of God on the Earth. The Báb's writings have an emphasis on recognizing a future prophet, "He whom God shall make manifest", when he arrives.

== Baháʼu'lláh ==
=== Within the Bábí movement ===
Baháʼu'lláh was born on November 12, 1817, in Tehran. Baháʼu'lláh's father was entitled Mírzá Buzurg while he served as vizier to Imám-Virdi Mírzá, the twelfth son of Fat′h Ali Shah Qajar. Mírzá Buzurg was later appointed governor of Burujird and Lorestan, a position that he was stripped of during a government purge when Muhammad Shah came to power. After his father died, Baháʼu'lláh was asked to take a government post by the new vizier Haji Mirza Aqasi, but he declined the position.

At the age of 28, Baháʼu'lláh received a messenger, Mullá Husayn, telling him of the Báb, whose message he accepted, becoming a Bábí. Baháʼu'lláh began to spread the new cause, especially in his native province of Núr, becoming recognized as one of its most influential believers. The accompanying government suppression of the Báb's religion resulted in Baháʼu'lláh's being imprisoned twice and enduring bastinado torture once. Baháʼu'lláh also attended the Conference of Badasht, where 81 prominent Bábís met for 22 days; at that conference where there was a discussion between those Bábís who wanted to maintain Islamic law and those who believed that the Báb's message began a new dispensation, Baháʼu'lláh took the pro-change side, which eventually won out.

Before his death, the Báb had been in correspondence with two brothers, Baháʼu'lláh and Ṣubḥ-i-Azal who, after the death of many prominent disciples, emerged as the mostly likely leaders. In a letter sent to Ṣubḥ-i-Azal, then aged around nineteen, the Báb appears to have indicated a high station or leadership position. The letter also orders Ṣubḥ-i-Azal to obey the Promised One when he appears; in practise, Ṣubḥ-i-Azal, however, seems to have had little widespread legitimacy and authority. Baháʼu'lláh in the meantime, while in private hinted at his own high station, in public kept his messianic secret from most and supported Ṣubḥ-i-Azal in the interest of unity.

In 1852, two years after the execution of the Báb, the Bábís were polarized with one group speaking of violent retribution against the Shah, Nasser-al-Din Shah while the other, under the leadership of Bahaʼu'lláh, looked to rebuild relationships with the government and advance the Bábí cause by persuasion and the example of virtuous living. The militant group of Bábís was between thirty and seventy persons, only a small number of the total Bábí population of perhaps 100,000. Their meetings appear to have come under the control of a "Husayn Jan", an emotive and magnetic figure who obtained a high degree of personal devotion to himself from the group.

Baháʼu'lláh met briefly with a couple of the radical Bábí leaders and learned of an assassination plan. He condemned the plan, but was soon asked to leave Tehran by the authorities. In the vacuum of leadership on August 15, 1852, about 3 Bábís attempted the assassination of the Shah and failed. Notwithstanding the assassins' claim that they were working alone, the entire Bábí community was blamed, and a slaughter of several thousand Bábís followed. Amidst the general violence, some Bábís, including Baháʼu'lláh, were imprisoned in the Síyáh-Chál (Black Pit), an underground dungeon of Tehran. According to Baháʼu'lláh, perhaps the lone survivor, it was during his imprisonment in the Síyáh-Chál that he had several mystical experiences, and that he received a vision of a Maiden from God, through whom he received his mission as a Messenger of God and as the One whose coming the Báb had prophesied.

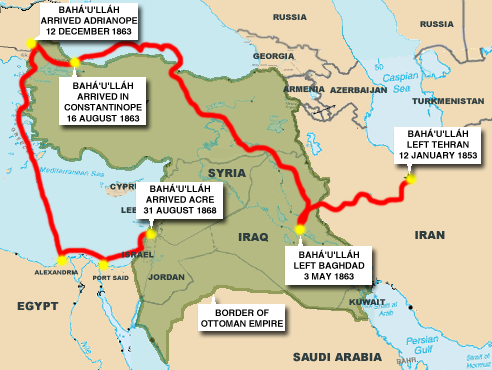
Map of Baháʼu'lláh's banishments

The government later found Baháʼu'lláh innocent of complicity in the assassination plot, and he was released from the Síyáh-Chál, but the government exiled him from Iran. Baháʼu'lláh was first exiled to Iraq in the Ottoman Empire and arrived in Baghdad in early 1853. A small number of Bábís, including his half-brother Ṣubḥ-i-Azal, followed Baháʼu'lláh to Baghdad. An increasing number of Bábís considered Baghdad the new centre for leadership of the Bábí religion, and a flow of pilgrims started coming there from Persia. In Baghdad people began to look to Ṣubḥ-i-Azal for leadership less and less due to his policy of remaining hidden, and instead saw Baháʼu'lláh as their leader. Ṣubḥ-i-Azal started to try to discredit Baháʼu'lláh and further divided the community. The actions of Subh-i-Azal drove many people away from the religion and allowed its enemies to continue their persecution.

On April 10, 1854, Baháʼu'lláh left Baghdad in order to distance himself from Ṣubḥ-i-Azal and to avoid becoming the source of disagreement within the Bábí community; he left with one companion to the mountains of Kurdistan, north-east of Baghdad, near the city Sulaymaniyah. For two years Baháʼu'lláh lived alone in the mountains of Kurdistan living the life of a Sufi dervish. At one point someone noticed his remarkable penmanship, which brought the curiosity of the instructors of the local Sufi orders. During his time in Kurdistan he wrote many notable books including the Four Valleys. In Baghdad, given the lack of firm and public leadership by Ṣubḥ-i-Azal, the Bábí community had fallen into disarray. Some Bábís, including Baháʼu'lláh's family, thus searched for Baháʼu'lláh, and pleaded with him to come back to Baghdad, which he did in 1856.

Baháʼu'lláh remained in Baghdád for seven more years. During this time, while keeping his perceived station as the Manifestation of God hidden, he taught the Báb's teachings. He published many books and verses including the Book of Certitude and the Hidden Words. Baháʼu'lláh's gatherings attracted many notables, both locals and Iranian pilgrims, giving him greater influence in Baghdad and in Iran. His rising influence in the city, and the revival of the Persian Bábí community gained the attention of his enemies in the Islamic clergy and the Persian government. They were eventually successful in having the Ottoman government exile Baháʼu'lláh from Baghdad to Constantinople.

=== Declaration and afterwards (1863–1892) ===
Before he left Baghdad on the way to Constantinople, Baháʼu'lláh camped for twelve days in the Garden of Ridván on the banks of the Tigris river near Baghdad starting on April 22, 1863. During his stay in the garden a large number of friends came to see him before he left. It was during his time in the Garden of Ridván that Baháʼu'lláh declared to his companions his perceived mission and station as a Messenger of God. Today Baháʼís celebrate the twelve days that Baháʼu'lláh was in the Garden of Ridván as the festival of Ridván.

After travelling for four months over land, Baháʼu'lláh arrived in the capital of the Ottoman Empire, Constantinople (now Istanbul). Although not a formal prisoner yet, the forced exile from Baghdad was the beginning of a long process which would gradually move him into further exiles and eventually to the penal colony of Akká, Ottomon Empire's Palestine (now Acre, Israel). Baháʼu'lláh and his family, along with a small group of Bábís, stayed in Constantinople for only four months. Due to his refusal to build alliances with the Ottoman politicians, Baháʼu'lláh had no means of resisting pressure from the Iranian ambassador to exile him further away, and Sultan Abdulaziz banished Baháʼu'lláh to Adrianople (current-day Edirne), which was a site for the exile of political prisoners.

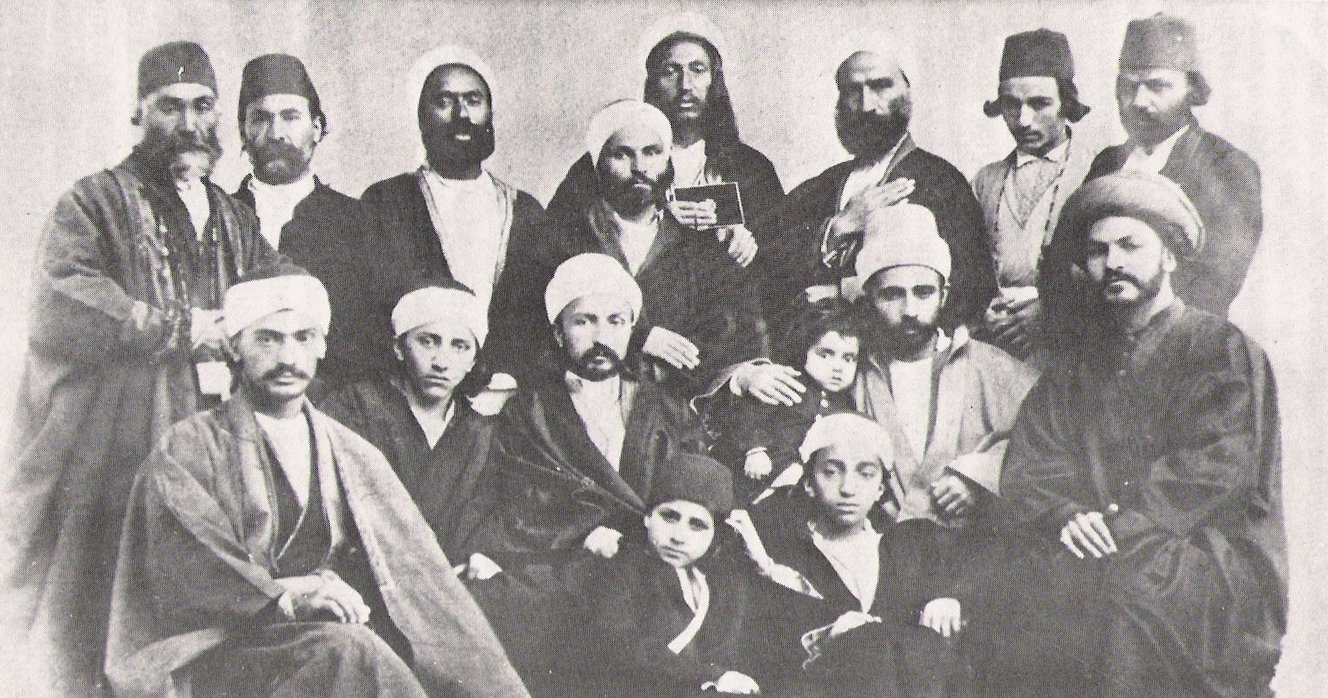
ʻAbdu'l-Bahá in Adrianople with his brothers and companions of Baháʼu'lláh.

During the month of December 1863, Baháʼu'lláh and his family embarked on a twelve-day journey to Adrianople. Baháʼu'lláh stayed in Adrianople for four and a half years. In Adrianople Baháʼu'lláh made his claim to be Him whom God shall make manifest more public through letters and tablets. Baháʼu'lláh's assertion as an independent Manifestation of God made Ṣubḥ-i-Azal's leadership position irrelevant; Ṣubḥ-i-Azal, upon hearing Baháʼu'lláh's words in a tablet read to him, challenging him to accept Baháʼu'lláh's revelation, refused and challenged Baháʼu'lláh to a test of divine will at a local mosque, but he lost face when he did not appear. This caused a break within the Bábí community, and the followers of Baháʼu'lláh—who became the vast majority—became known as Baháʼís, while the followers of Ṣubḥ-i-Azal became known as Azalis.

Starting in 1866, while in Adrianople, Baháʼu'lláh started writing a series of letters to world rulers, proclaiming his station as the promised one of all religions. His letters also asked them to renounce their material possessions, work together to settle disputes, and endeavour towards the betterment of the world and its peoples. Some of these leaders written to in the coming years include Pope Pius IX, Napoleon III of France, Czar Alexander II of Russia, Queen Victoria of Great Britain and Ireland, Násiriʼd-Dín Sháh of the Persian Empire and the rulers of America.

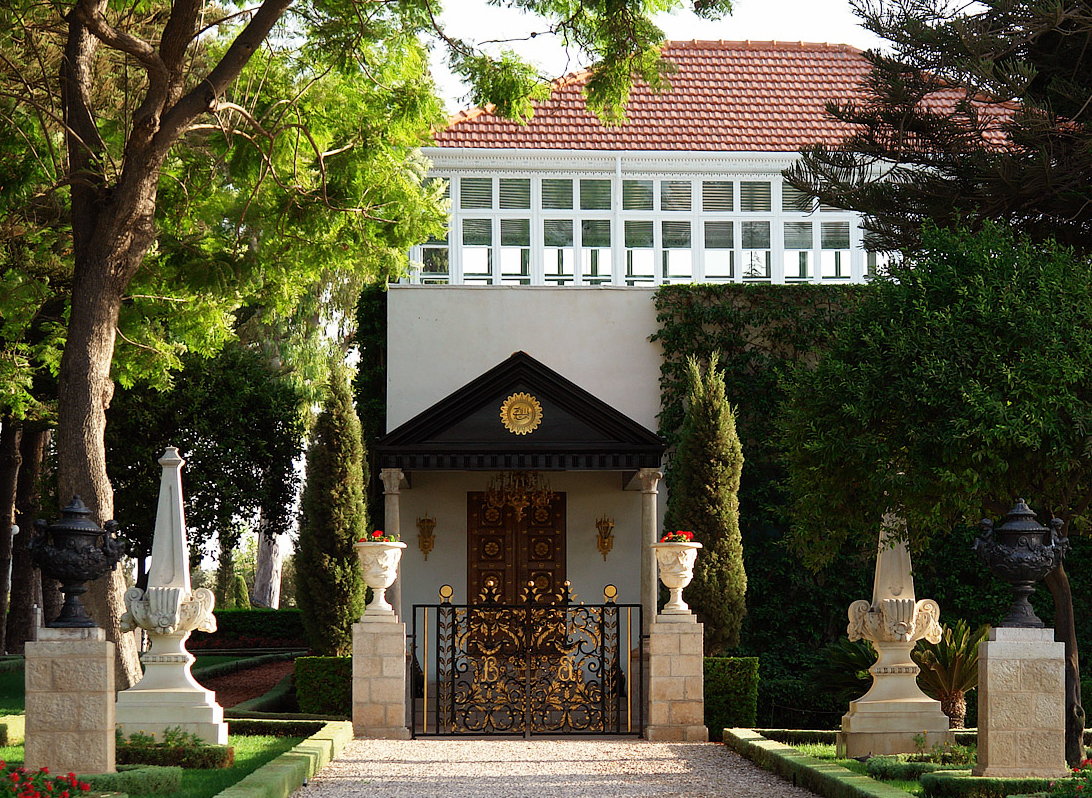
Shrine of Baháʼu'lláh

The disagreements between the Baháʼís and the Azalís allowed the Ottoman and Persian authorities to exile Baháʼu'lláh once again. Baháʼu'lláh and his family left Adrianople on August 12, 1868, and after a journey by land and sea arrived in Acre on August 31. The first years in Acre imposed very harsh conditions on, and held very trying times for, Baháʼu'lláh. Mirzá Mihdí, Baháʼu'lláh's son, suddenly died at the age of twenty-two when he fell through a skylight while pacing back and forth in prayer and meditation. After some time, the people and officials began to trust and respect Baháʼu'lláh, and thus the conditions of the imprisonment were eased and eventually, after Ottoman Sultan Abdulaziz's death, he was allowed to leave the city and visit nearby places.

From 1877 until 1879 Baháʼu'lláh lived in the house of Mazra'ih.

The final years of Baháʼu'lláh's life were spent in the Mansion of Bahjí, just outside Acre, even though he was still formally a prisoner of the Ottoman Empire. During his years in Acre and Bahjí, Baháʼu'lláh produced many volumes of work including the Kitáb-i-Aqdas. On May 9, 1892, Baháʼu'lláh contracted a slight fever which grew steadily over the following days, abated, and then finally took his life on May 29, 1892. He was buried in a Shrine located next to the Mansion of Bahjí in Israel. During his lifetime, communities of Baháʼís were established in Armenia, Burma, Egypt, Georgia, India, Lebanon, (what is now) Pakistan, Sudan, Syria, Turkey, and Turkmenistan.

== Ministry of ʻAbdu'l-Bahá (1892–1921) ==
Baháʼu'lláh was succeeded by his eldest son, ʻAbdu'l-Bahá. In Baháʼu'lláh's will, ʻAbdu'l-Bahá was designated as the "Center of the Covenant," the head of the Baháʼí Faith, and the sole authoritative interpreter of Baháʼu'lláh's writings.

ʻAbdu'l-Bahá had shared his father's long exile and imprisonment. This imprisonment continued until ʻAbdu'l-Bahá's own release as a result of the "Young Turk" revolution in 1908. Following his release, he led a life of travelling, speaking, teaching, and maintaining correspondence with communities of believers and individuals, expounding the principles of the Baháʼí Faith. He was also instrumental in preparing for and conducting the burial of the remains of the Báb on March 21, 1909, in a six-room mausoleum made of local stone.

Following ʻAbdu'l-Bahá's release, he went on several journeys to Europe and America where he spoke about the Baháʼí Faith, especially from 1910 to 1913, and maintained correspondence with communities of believers and individuals, expounding the principles of the Baháʼí Faith. ʻAbdu'l-Bahá died in Haifa on November 28, 1921, and is now buried in one of the front rooms in the Shrine of the Báb, in Haifa, Israel. The construction of a new Shrine for ʻAbdu'l-Bahá between Haifa and Acre began in 2020 but is not yet completed. During his lifetime communities of Baháʼís formed in Australia, Austria, Brazil, Canada, China, the United Kingdom, France, Germany, the Netherlands, Hungary, Italy, Japan, Jordan, Russia, South Africa, Switzerland, Tunisia, and the United States of America.

== Ministry of Shoghi Effendi (1921–1957) ==
The Will and Testament of ʻAbdu'l-Bahá is the charter of the Baháʼí administrative order. In this document ʻAbdu'l-Bahá established the institutions of the appointed Guardianship and the elected Universal House of Justice. In that same document he appointed his eldest grandson, Shoghi Effendi, as the first Guardian of the Baháʼí Faith.

Shoghi Effendi throughout his lifetime translated the sacred writings of the Baháʼí Faith; developed global plans for the expansion of the Baháʼí community; developed the Baháʼí World Centre; carried on a voluminous correspondence with communities and individuals around the world; and built the administrative structure of the Faith, preparing the community for the election of the Universal House of Justice.

During this time, Marie of Romania, former queen-consort of Romania, was introduced to the Baháʼí Faith by Martha Root. Marie corresponded with Shoghi Effendi and praised the Baháʼí Faith, leading many Baháʼís to describe her as the first Crowned Head to accept Baháʼu'lláh's teachings. She was especially drawn to the Baháʼí teaching of the unity of religion given the religious divide within her family. That said, while Marie prayed "better at home with [Baháʼu'lláh's] books and teachings," she continued to attend a Protestant church and her daughter denied that she ever converted.

In 1953, Shoghi Effendi launched a ten-year Baháʼí teaching plan with the goal of establishing many new National Spiritual Assemblies and forming the Universal House of Justice, the highest elected Baháʼí body, for the first time in 1963 with National Spiritual Assemblies around the world participating in the election. This plan is commonly known as the Ten Year Crusade. The means for spreading the Baháʼí Faith was what Baháʼís beginning with Shoghi Effendi have called "pioneering," in which Baháʼís relocate to places within their country or in another country where there are not Baháʼí communities. Those who started Baháʼí communities in new countries were given the title of Knights of Baháʼu'lláh.

== Ministry of the Custodians (1957–1963) ==
With the unexpected passing of Shoghi Effendi in 1957 without children, the Baháʼí world was left without any eligible successor for the role of Guardian. The Hands of the Cause, who had been appointed by Shoghi Effendi as "Stewards," took over as a collective leadership, continued the Ten Year Crusade, and organized the first election of the Universal House of Justice in 1963, making themselves ineligible for membership. By the time of the election of the Universal House of Justice, National Spiritual Assemblies had been elected in 56 countries and territories, a considerable increase over the 12 in existence at the start of the Ten Year Crusade in 1953. All of these National Spiritual Assemblies participated in the election of the Universal House of Justice as envisioned in Shoghi Effendi's plan for the Ten Year Crusade.

== Universal House of Justice (1963–present) ==
After the election of the Universal House of Justice in 1963, it then ruled that given the unique situation and the provisions of the Will and Testament of ʻAbdu'l-Bahá, it was not possible to appoint another Guardian. The Universal House of Justice today remains the supreme governing body of the Baháʼí Faith, and its nine members are elected every five years. The Universal House of Justice is supported by the International Teaching Centre and other appointed Baháʼí institutions.

Since its first election in 1963, the Universal House of Justice has overseen many international plans to spread the Baháʼí Faith, known as Baháʼí teaching plans. Up to the year 2000, there were six of these: the Nine-Year Plan (1964–1973), the Five-Year Plan (1974–1979), the Seven-Year Plan (1979–1986), the Six-Year Plan (1986–1992), the Three-Year Plan (1993–1996), and the Four-Year Plan (1996–2000).

Starting with the Nine-Year Plan that began in 1964, the Baháʼí leadership sought to continue the expansion of the religion but also to "consolidate" new members, meaning increase their knowledge of the Baháʼí teachings. In this vein, in the 1970s, the Ruhi Institute was founded by Baháʼís in Colombia to offer short courses on Baháʼí beliefs, ranging in length from a weekend to nine days. The associated Ruhi Foundation, whose purpose was to systematically "consolidate" new Baháʼís, was registered in 1992, and since the late 1990s the courses of the Ruhi Institute have been the dominant way of teaching the Baháʼí Faith around the world.

In May 1970, the Baháʼí International Community (BIC) gained consultative status with the United Nations Economic and Social Council (ECOSOC) and in 1976 it gained the same status with the United Nations Children's Fund (UNICEF). In 1989, the BIC developed a working relationship with the World Health Organization, and it also has a working relationship with various other United Nations agencies and enterprises including the UN Development Fund for Women (UNIFEM) and United Nations Environment Programme (UNEP).

Since the Iranian Revolution of 1979, Iranian Baháʼís have regularly had their homes ransacked or been banned from holding government jobs, and several hundred have received prison sentences for their religious beliefs, for instance for participating in Baháʼí study circles. Baháʼí cemeteries have been desecrated and property has been seized and occasionally demolished, including the House of Mírzá Buzurg, Baháʼu'lláh's father. The House of the Báb in Shiraz, one of three sites to which Baháʼís perform pilgrimage, has been destroyed twice. The Iranian government forbids Baháʼís from attending university unless they identify themselves as Muslims on entrance exams, but the Baháʼí teachings forbid Baháʼís to dissimulate their religious beliefs. In 1987, the Baháʼí community established its own program of higher education whose classes were held in private homes and had an enrolment of approximately 900 students, which evolved to become known as the Baháʼí Institute for Higher Education. The New York Times described the program as "an elaborate act of communal self-preservation."

The Baháʼí Faith entered a new phase of activity when a message of the Universal House of Justice dated October 20, 1983, was released. Baháʼís were urged to seek out ways, compatible with the Baháʼí teachings, in which they could become involved in the social and economic development of the communities in which they lived. Worldwide in 1979 there were 129 officially recognized Baháʼí socio-economic development projects, while by 1987 there were 1,482.

As Baháʼí communities were not established in all countries and territories during the Ten Year Crusade launched by Shoghi Effendi, new national Baháʼí communities continued to be formed and those who established them continued to receive the title of Knights of Baháʼu'lláh. The last Knight of Baháʼu'lláh, Sean Hinton, received the title after bringing the religion to Mongolia in 1988. On May 28, 1992, during a commemoration for the centenary of the Baháʼu'lláh's death, a "Roll of Honour" with the names of the Knights of Baháʼu'lláh was deposited by Rúhíyyih Khanum at the entrance door of the Shrine of Baháʼu'lláh.

Malietoa Tanumafili II of Samoa, who became Baháʼí in 1968 and died in 2007, was the first serving head of state to embrace the Baháʼí Faith.

=== Current state of the Baháʼí community ===
Baháʼí scholar Moojan Momen writes that as of 2006 the Baháʼí Faith was established in 191 independent countries, with 179 National Spiritual Assemblies, and that Baháʼí literature had been translated into 800 languages by that year. According to Encyclopædia Britannica, the Baháʼí Faith is the second-most geographically widespread religion after Christianity in terms of being present in the highest number of locations. Sociologist Margit Warburg argues that this is due to the Baháʼí strategy of establishing a presence everywhere possible even if sometimes only a very small one. The only countries with no Baháʼís documented as of 2008 are Vatican City and North Korea. (Note: Baháʼís did enter Korea in 1921 before the Division of Korea.) Also, while Israel is a destination for Baháʼí pilgrimage, Baháʼí staff in Israel do not teach their religion to Israelis following the policy of the Baháʼí administration. The members of the Baháʼí Faith remain nearly entirely united in a single, organized, hierarchical community. (Note: There are no major schisms in the Baháʼí Faith, and sects based on attempts to form alternative leadership have either become extinct with time or have remained in extremely small numbers; their members are shunned as Covenant-breakers by the majority.)

Most scholarly sources estimate that there are from five to eight million Baháʼís in the world in the early 21st century. In 2020, the Secretariat of the Universal House of Justice wrote that, "on the basis of information received from Baháʼí communities across the world, and on reputable external sources," the current estimate for the number of Baháʼís worldwide is "about eight million" and that Baháʼís reside in "well over 100,000 localities."

The most recent full election of the Universal House of Justice was on 29 April 2023. A one-year Baháʼí teaching plan was launched in 2021 by the Universal House of Justice's annual Ridván message to the worldwide Baháʼí community. This was followed by the beginning of a nine-year teaching plan launched in 2022's Ridván message. These two teaching plans are intended as the first two in a longer series of plans covering the period of 2021–2046.

== Alternate periodization ==
The Baháʼí Faith's history has also been broken into three stages based on the religion's geographic spread by historian Peter Smith. First, in the "Islamic" stage from 1844 to c.1892, Bábism and then the Baháʼí Faith originated in the Middle East and other nearby predominantly Muslim regions. Next, in the "international" stage from c.1892 to c.1953, the Baháʼí Faith spread beyond predominantly Muslim regions and arrived in many countries in the Western world. Finally, in the "global" stage from c.1953 to the present day, the Baháʼí Faith spread almost worldwide, especially in the Global South.

== See also ==
- Baháʼí timeline
- Outline of the Baháʼí Faith
- Baháʼí studies
