= The Dawn-Breakers =

Historical account of the early Bábí and Baháʼí Faiths written by Nabíl-i-Aʻzam

The Dawn-Breakers: Nabíl's Narrative of the Early Days of the Baháʼí Revelation (Maṭāleʿ al-anwār) or Nabíl's Narrative (Táríkh-i-Nabíl) is an account of the early Bábí and Baháʼí Faiths written in Persian by Nabíl-i-Aʻzam in 1887–1888. The English translation by Shoghi Effendi was published in 1932.

The book relies mainly on the memoirs of surviving early Bábís, and Nabíl himself was a participant in many of the scenes which he recounts.

Many of the photographs of the Baháʼí historical sites in Iran that illustrate the English version were made by Effie Baker. She was requested to do so by Shoghi Effendi in the early 1930s, and travelled to Iran alone by car from Haifa, Mandate Palestine, wearing a chador for safety purposes.

Shoghi Effendi's intention for publishing the English translation was to inspire greater dedication and self-sacrifice in its readers. He gave importance to the study of The Dawn-Breakers and describes the Baháʼís as "spiritual descendants of the dawn-breakers".

William P. Collins states that the narrative reflects, in addition to history, a universal sacred story or monomyth as described by Joseph Campbell (e.g. the story of Mullá Husayn).

== The narrative ==
The part of the book that has been published in English tells the story of the early Baháʼí history and is set in 19th-century Iran until around 1853. The narrative focuses on Shaykh Ahmad and Sayyid Kazim Rashti, the life of the Báb, the Letters of the Living, among whom are Mullá Husayn, Quddús, Táhirih, and further Dayyán, Hujjat and Baháʼu'lláh.

== Translations ==
The work was first edited, partially translated into English and printed in 1932 by Shoghi Effendi, great-grandson of Baháʼu'lláh and then head of the religion. This translation covers roughly the first half of the original narrative. The original text has never been published in full, though there are Persian and Arabic translations of Shoghi Effendi's English version. The book, either the complete edition or the abridged one, has been translated in several other languages as well. The original manuscript is held in the International Baháʼí Archives in Haifa, Israel.

H.M. Balyuzi, who used the second part of the manuscript as one of his sources for Baháʼu'lláh, King of Glory, states that it mostly concerns events which Nabíl witnessed with his own eyes. Significant portions of the original text were included in the eight volumes of the Tarikh Zuhur al-Haqq, a history of the Bábí and Baháʼí religions which includes copious documentary material, written and compiled by the Iranian Baháʼí scholar Mírzá Asadu'lláh Fádil Mázandarání in the late 1930s and early 1940s and has been published in Persian online.

== Influence ==
The book had a great impact on the Western Baháʼís' understanding of their religion and its links to Bábism.

Bahiyyih Nakhjavani uses the story of the theft of the Báb's saddlebag during his pilgrimage to Mecca, in chapter VII of The Dawn-Breakers, as the focal point for her novel The Saddlebag — A Fable for Doubters and Seekers.

Many groups and organizations have been named after it, most notably the Dawn Breakers International Film Festival, Dawn Breakers High School in India and the Los Angeles-based music group Dawnbreaker Collective, London based Dawnbreakers (b-boy dance crew), 1966 music group by Seals and Crofts called "Dawnbreakers" and the Germany-based publishing company "DawnBreakers Publisher".

== Editions ==
- Zarandi, Nabil (1932) [1890]. Effendi, Shoghi (ed.). The Dawn-Breakers: Nabíl's Narrative. Translated by Effendi, Shoghi (Hardcover ed.). Wilmette, Illinois, USA: Baháʼí Publishing Trust. OCLC 3023868.\ - complete edition, with illustrations, footnotes in English and French, complete introduction and appendices.
- Zarandi, Nabil (1953) [1890]. Effendi, Shoghi (ed.). The Dawn-Breakers: Nabíl's Narrative (Hardcover ed.). London, UK: Baháʼí Publishing Trust. OCLC 22698144. - abridged, without illustrations.
- Sorabjee, Zena (1974) [1890]. Nabíl's Narrative - Abridged. Translated by Effendi, Shoghi (Softcover ed.). New Delhi, India: Baháʼí Publishing Trust. ISBN 81-85091-54-4. - abridged, with illustrations.

== See also ==
- Baháʼí history
- God Passes By
- Dawn Breakers International Film Festival
