= Baháʼí Faith in Pakistan =

The Baháʼí Faith originated in the 19th century Persian empire, and soon spread into the neighboring British India, which is now Pakistan and other states. The roots of the religion in Pakistan go back to the 1840s, and it was recognized in the constitution of 1981 as a religious minority with legal rights. According to various sources, there are 2,000 to 87,000 Baha'is living in Pakistan.

One of the disciples of the Báb, Shaykh Saʼid-i-Hindi, was from Multan, Pakistan, and was instructed by the Báb to spread the religion to his homeland. Shaykh Saʼid-i-Hindi converted a blind man named Basir from Multan, who later traveled to Iran, met Baháʼu'lláh, and was reportedly killed there for his beliefs. Another early Indian convert was Qahru'llah, who met the Báb in Chihríq and returned to India. Baháʼu'lláh later encouraged followers to travel to India and spread the Baháʼí Faith there.

In 1921 the Baháʼís of Karachi elected their first Baháʼí Local Spiritual Assembly and acquired a Baháʼí Center before independence. In 1923, still as part of India, a regional National Spiritual Assembly was formed for all India and Burma which then included the area now part of Pakistan. By 1956 Baháʼí local assemblies spread across many cities, and in 1957, East and West Pakistan elected a separate National Baháʼí Assembly from India and later East Pakistan became Bangladesh with its own national assembly. In 1978, Baháʼís in Pakistan established a Montessori School in Karachi that continues functioning as the "New Day Secondary School". The school started with three students and by 2015 had over 700 enrolled. There are about 12 Baháʼí Centers (a.k.a. Baháʼí Halls) spread around Pakistan.

With the constitutional recognition that they received in 1981, Bahá’ís in Pakistan have had the right to hold public meetings, establish academic centers, teach their faith, and elect their administrative councils. However, the government prohibits Baháʼís from travelling to Israel for Baháʼí pilgrimage, and they face challenges due to the requirement to identify religion on identity papers. Many Baháʼís feel threatened and avoid displaying their religious identity publicly. Most Pakistanis have not heard about the Bahá’í Faith and consider it to be a sect of Islam or a cult. Minority Rights Group International in its 2002 report states that the Bahá’í in Pakistan, "are still a young and almost invisible community, which is confined to intellectuals who try to keep out of the limelight. Their magazines and books are available in Urdu but the fundamentalists, unlike their counterparts in Iran, have not yet seen them as a threat."

Baháʼís in Pakistan are very active. They organize social programs for their community, as well as activities in which others can participate. Activities are focused on the teachings and writings of Baháʼu'lláh, and are similar to those of Baháʼís around the world: children's classes, junior youth spiritual empowerment, study circles, devotional gatherings, and other social activities. Their official website claims that they are active in "literacy programs for rural areas, free medical camps and tree plantations, discourses with dignitaries and leaders of thought, promoting interaction amongst the youth of all communities and by actively participating in dialogues on religious coexistence." There is a large annual gathering of Baháʼís in Pakistan that takes place in the auditorium of the National Council of Arts, Islamabad, to celebrate the Baháʼí holy day of Ridván. The gathering is attended by government ministers and other faith groups.

== Demographics and size ==
According to Baháʼí sources, the Baháʼí population in Pakistan was around 30,000 in 2001, and around 1,000 individuals had completed Ruhi Book 1 by 2004.

The first edition of World Christian Encyclopedia (1982) estimated the Baháʼís in Pakistan to be 100 in 1900, 15,100 in 1970, 20,000 in 1975, and 25,000 in 1980, with an annual growth rate of 4.5% from 1970 to 1980. It also noted that the Baháʼís in Pakistan had, "rapid growth from 19 local spiritual assemblies (1964) to 97 (1973). Baha'is are mostly Persian residents."

The second edition of World Christian Encyclopedia (2001) estimated the Baháʼís in Pakistan to be 55,100 in 1990, 68,500 in 1995, and 78,658 in 2000, with an annual growth rate of 3.64% from 1990 to 2000. Based on the same dataset and projected growth rate, ARDA estimated 87,259 in 2010.

Pakistan's National Database and Registration Authority (NADRA) is a national statistical database that records the religion of all citizens. In 2012 there were 33,734 Baháʼís registered, and in 2018 there were 31,543 Baháʼí voters.

Shoba Das of Minority Rights Group International reported in 2013, "There are around 200 Baha’is in Islamabad, and perhaps two or three thousand in the whole of Pakistan."

In 2014, a correspondent for The News International visited Baháʼís in Lahore and reported, "At least 200 followers of Bahá’í faith currently reside here in Lahore... " with a mix of Iranian and Pakistani backgrounds, with both men and women serving on the Local Spiritual Assembly.

In his PhD thesis for the Islamic University of Islamabad (2015), Abdul Fareed researched the Baháʼís of Pakistan and wrote,

According to the International Religious Freedom Report 2002 of the Bureau of Democracy, Human Rights and Labor, U.S. Department of State, the estimated population of the Bahá’ís of Pakistan was 30,000. In its 2010 and 2013 reports, U.S. government estimates the population of the Bahá’ís of Pakistan approximately 30,000... the National Database and Registration Authority (NADRA) of the government of Pakistan claims that... there are over 33,000 Pakistanis who declare them as Bahá’í. These are the official figures which show the Bahá’ís of Pakistan are a significant minority. However, the ground facts seem different. A large number of the Bahá’ís of Pakistan belong to the rural areas of the province Sindhi. There are many Hindu tribes in the rural Sindh called the Bhels and Meghwar. A significant number of these tribesmen accepted the Bahá’í faith and converted to Bahá’ísm. But many of them are no longer active in the Bahá’í activities. This mass conversion is due to some social works done in the areas of Hyderabad, Matli, Badin, Sukkur and Mirpurkhas. The Bahá’ís of Pakistan state that they do not know the actual population of Bahá’ís and they rely on the statistics of NADRA. It is an assumption that the Bahá’ís do not want to declare their exact population, which is supposed to be more or less 3000 in total... The large number of the Bahá’ís is in Karachi and the rural Sindh. However, the statistics offered by NADRA has to be believed. However, the exact population of Bahá’í community is not known.

Abdul Fareed visited several Baháʼí communities in Pakistan and said that they come from diverse linguistic and regional backgrounds, but he found many converts are from an Ahmadi and some from Shia background. He also claims that most Baháʼís in Pakistan have roots in Iran, in part due to the persecution of Baháʼís in Iran driving many to leave their homeland and find citizenship elsewhere.

According to Minority Rights Group International, the Baháʼís are generally converts and middle-class urbanites who keep a very low profile. So far they have escaped any collective anger from other majority communities due to their small number and limited activities.

== History ==
=== Bábí period ===
The roots of the Baháʼí Faith in the region go back to the first days of the Bábí religion in 1844. Four Babis are known from India in this earliest period — it is not known from what sub-region most of them came from but at least some of them were known as Sufis and some termed Sayyid. The first was Shaykh Sa'id Hindi — one of the Letters of the Living who was from Multan then in India. Basir-i-Hindi was a member of the Jalalia sect who also converted in this early period from the region which later became Pakistan. After embracing the Bábí religion, Hindi set out to Iran but learned that the Báb had been confined to the hills of Azerbaijan and made his way to Fort Tabarsi where he was one of four Indians listed among the 318 Bábís who fought at the Battle of Fort Tabarsi. After that he went to Nur and met Baháʼu'lláh and later moved to Luristan where he worked in the court of the governor of Luristan, Yaldram Mirza. When the governor learned he was a Bábí, he was killed.

=== Early Baháʼí period ===
During Baháʼu'lláh's lifetime, as founder of the Baháʼí Faith, he encouraged some of his followers to move to India. After first visiting Mumbai, India, Jamal Effendi visited Karachi in 1875 on one of his trips to parts of Southern Asia. His trips included Lahore, Sialkot, Jammu, Kashmir, Ladakh. Following the passing of Baháʼu'lláh, the leadership of the religion fell to ʻAbdu'l-Bahá and he in turn sent further representatives to the region — followers who travelled to the region included both Persians and Americans and included Sydney Sprague and Mirza Mahmood Zarghaní.

On instructions from ʻAbdu'l-Bahá, Zarghaní stayed in Lahore for most of 1904 and subsequently travelled to nearby regions. There is information that an American Baháʼí was in Lahore about 1905; little is known except that he became sick with cholera but recovered under care from a Baháʼí, Mr. Kaikhosru, who came from (then named) Bombay to nurse him but himself died of the disease.

The first Baháʼí to settle in current-day Pakistan may have been Muhammad Raza Shirazi who became a Baháʼí in Bombay in 1908 and settled in Karachi. As early as 1910 the national community in India/Burma was being urged to visibly distinguish itself from Islam by the Baháʼí institutions of America. Jamshed Jamshedi moved from Iran to Karachi in 1917 and Mirza Qalich Beg translated The Hidden Words into Sindhi. National coordinated activities across India began and reached a peak with the first All-India Convention which occurred in Mumbai for three days in December 1920. Representatives from India's major religious communities were present as well as Baháʼí delegates from throughout the country. In 1921 the Baháʼís of Karachi elected their first Baháʼí Local Spiritual Assembly.

=== Growth and challenges ===
In 1923, while what is now Pakistan was part of British India, a regional National Spiritual Assembly was formed for India and Burma - which then included the area now part of Pakistan. Martha Root, an American Baháʼí, visited Karachi and Lahore in 1930 and again in 1938 when she stayed for three months and supervised the publication of her book titled Tahirih — the Pure. She died about a year later. The Baháʼís of Karachi obtained land for a cemetery in 1931. Mirza Tarazullah Samandari, later appointed as a Hand of the Cause — a distinguished rank in the religion —, visited the area several times; he first visited the region in 1930, and then again in 1963, 1964, 1966, and in 1993 travelling to many cities. From 1931 to 1933, Professor Pritam Singh, the first Baháʼí from a Sikh background, settled in Lahore and published an English language weekly called The Bahaʼi Weekly and other initiatives. A Baháʼí publishing committee was established in Karachi in 1935. This body evolved and is registered as the Bahaʼi Publishing Trust of Pakistan. In 1937, John Esslemont's Baháʼu'lláh and the New Era was translated into Urdu and Gujarati in Karachi. The committee also published scores of Baháʼí books and leaflets in Urdu, English, Arabic, Persian, Sindhi, Pushtu, Balochi, Gojri, Balti and Punjabi and memorials including those marking the centenaries of the declaration of the Báb and Baháʼu'lláh.

The Local Spiritual Assembly of Quetta was formed in 1943 by Baháʼís from Mumbai and Iran while the Local Spiritual Assembly of Hyderabad was also formed in 1943 by Baháʼís from Karachi. A spiritual assembly was elected for the first time in Jammu in 1946. Baháʼís from Karachi were among those to help elect the local spiritual assemblies in Sukkur and Rawalpindi in 1948. Further local assemblies were formed in Sialkot in 1949, Multan, Chittagong, and Dhaka in 1950, Faisalabad in 1952, Sargodha in 1955, and Abbottabad, Gujranwala, Jahanabad, Mirpurkhas, Nawabshah, and Sahiwal by 1956 thus raising the number of local spiritual assemblies to 20. Hand of the Cause Dorothy Beecher Baker spoke at a variety of events in India extending her stay twice to speak at schools – her last public talk was in Karachi in early 1954. Meanwhile, a Muslim émigré from near Lahore, Fazel (Frank) Khan, moved to Australia where he was asked to present the teachings of Islam at a Baháʼí school and was so affected by the class that he and his family converted to the Baháʼí Faith in 1947. On two later occasions Fazel visited his home village and endeavoured to teach them his new religion. On the first visit there was no response, but during the second visit a cousin converted in the town of Sialkot. On the other hand, a fatwa was issued in Sialkot against the Baháʼís.

Plans for an independent national assembly for Pakistan began as early as spring 1954. A regional convention in Karachi in 1956 had 17 delegates. With independence from India proceeding, the Baháʼís of East and West Pakistan elected a separate Baháʼí National Spiritual Assembly from India in 1957, witnessed by Hand of the Cause Shuʼáʼu'llah ʻAláʼí. The Baháʼís elected to this first national assembly included Isfandiar Bakhtiari, Chaudhri Abdur Rehman, Faridoon Yazameidi, A.C. Joshi, M.H. IImi, Abdul Abbas Rizvi, M.A. Latif, Nawazish Ali Shah, and Mehboob Iiahi Qureshi. Joshi in particular was then the chairman of the national assembly and had been elected to assemblies since 1947 and eventually in other institutions. The new national assembly saw to the publishing of a history of the Baháʼí Faith in Pakistan in 1957.

In 1961 the national assembly held a reception to honor the dedication of the Baháʼí House of Worship in Australia by inviting Australian and other diplomats as well as judges of Pakistani courts, business leaders and college professors while the local assembly of Sukkur hosted a regional summer school. In 1962 one was hosted by the local assembly of Quetta. In 1963 the Universal House of Justice, the international governing body of the Baháʼís, was elected and all nine members of the Pakistani National Spiritual Assembly participated in the voting. In 1964 Hand of the Cause Tarázu'lláh Samandari visited Baháʼís and social leaders in Dacca, East Pakistan at the time. From 1946 through the 1980s the Baháʼí publishing trust published a variety of works oriented to youth.

=== Mason Remey's influence ===
In 1960 Mason Remey declared himself to be the successor of Shoghi Effendi, thus he was excommunicated by the Hands of the cause at Haifa and expelled from the Baháʼí faith. He was declared a covenant-breaker. A small group of Baha’i's in Pakistan accepted his claims and published some materials from 1965 through 1972. Rawalpindi, Pakistan was one of three local assemblies that Remey appointed, and Pakistan was one of two countries to form a national assembly loyal to Remey, which was only active for a few years. He also had followers in Faisalabad and Sialkot. A newsletter published by Baháʼís loyal to Remey announced in 1964 that almost all the Baháʼís in Pakistan accepted Remey as the successor to Shoghi Effendi. Encyclopædia Iranica also states that Mason Remey was "successful in Pakistan".

== Modern community life ==
Government officials have occasionally attended events at Baháʼí centres. However, the government prohibits Baháʼís from travelling to Israel for Baháʼí pilgrimage. The government of Pakistan also voted against the United Nations resolution Situation of Human Rights in the Islamic Republic of Iran on 19 December 2001 raised in response to the Persecution of Baháʼís in Iran. In 2003 a series of youth collaborations highlighted internal developments in the community using the Ruhi Institute process. Indeed, nearly 1000 individuals had completed Ruhi Book 1 by 2004, and classes have continued through 2007. In 2004 the Baháʼís of Lahore began seeking for a new Baháʼí cemetery.

=== History since 1967 ===
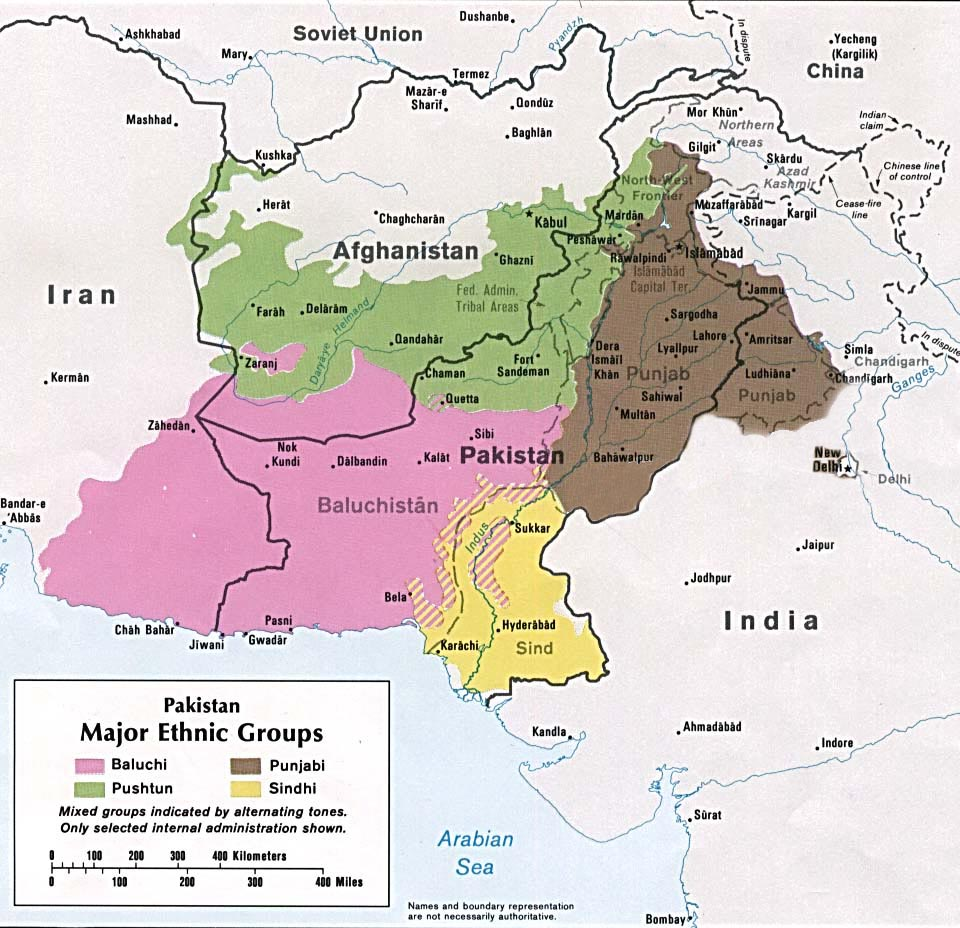
Major ethnic groups in Pakistan and surrounding areas, in 1980.

In Pakistan, 1967 was a year of multiplying activities. The Baháʼí youth of Karachi sponsored a youth symposium on world peace, the community at large elected a woman to the national assembly, for the first time elected a local assembly in Rahim Yar Khan, and held a reception for a Baháʼí from the Sokoine University of Agriculture in Morogoro with guests including executive engineers, attorneys, businessmen and industrialists, doctors, press representatives, bankers and university students. In 1972 the assembly of Karachi held an observance of United Nations Day which over one hundred people attended. Talks presented dealt with the elimination of racial discrimination. Also in 1972 the government of Pakistan invited the National Spiritual Assembly of the Baháʼís to send a delegate to participate in a Conference of the Religious Minorities. By 1974 there were Baháʼís that were members of the Bhil tribe in Thatta. In 1975 Baháʼís held meetings for the International Women's Year and a seminar on "Education in Pakistan." In 1976 Baháʼís were invited to participate in a week long celebration of minorities. Later Baháʼís and non-Baháʼís gathered to commemorate Letter of the Living Táhirih and a Baháʼí was acknowledged as part of the delegation from Pakistan to an Asian conference on religion and peace by the chief Muslim delegate late in the conference. In 1977 membership of the Baháʼís reached the state of Kalat and Tharparkar. The 1977 winter school gathered 250 Baháʼís while 1978's gathered 350.

In 1978 conditions in Afghanistan, including the Soviet invasion, lead to many Afghan Baháʼís being arrested in that country and many fled to Pakistan. Iranian Baháʼís also fled to Pakistan from Iran in 1979 due to the Iranian Revolution. In 1979 the New Day Montessori School was established with ten students but would grow in time to three hundred and most of the students were not Baháʼís. At this time Baháʼís report there were 83 assemblies amongst many hundreds of places Baháʼís lived which included three district centers and there were 47 delegates to the national convention. In winter 1979–80 Zahida Hina gave a speech on the life and works of Táhirih at a women's conference. In spring 1980 for the International Year of the Child the local assembly of Hyderabad organized an event that showcased children's art, essays, singing and quiz competitions, and the topic of the elimination of racial prejudice was a theme in Baháʼí gatherings in several cities. In the summer an institute and a seminar were held for children and youth covering a variety of topics including "The Role of Baha'i Youth during Political Upheavals." That fall and winter further gatherings were held, this time commemorating the United Nations Day (which highlighted the Commission for Prevention of Discrimination and Protection of Minorities) and a talk by a professor of Superior Science College (see Government Colleges affiliated with the University of Karachi) which encouraged discussion on the elimination of prejudices.

Before spring 1981, the youth of Karachi organized a conference recapitulating many of the same themes of games, quizzes, a poster contest and round of prayers. Come April and May there was a broad attempt at engaging several interest groups from primary and secondary schools, universities and colleges, professional publishers and the general public through a radio broadcast. Still that spring, president of Pakistan, Muhammad Zia-ul-Haq, wrote an executive order categorizing the Baháʼí Faith as a non-Muslim religion. That December the Baháʼís again held an observance of United Nations Day in several cities that received press coverage from print and radio. Representatives of the Muslim, Christian, Hindu, Zoroastrian and Baháʼí communities gathered for a symposium in the fall of 1982 with the theme, "The Increasing Social Unrest in the World Today and its Solution" while presentations were made to judges and lawyers about the Persecution of Baháʼís in Iran. Still in the fall a women's conference brought together sixty non-Baha'i women who were wives of judges, university professors, headmistresses and teachers to hear talks. And in January 1983 a multi-faith presentation covered "the need of religion" on World Religion Day held in Karachi. In February and April Baháʼís gathered for regional school sessions in Karachi, Quetta, Rawalpindi and Sibi. In August assemblies were formed for the first time in Sialkot, near Lahore, and Multan, the birthplace of Letter of the Living, Sa'id-i-Hindi. In September a symposium on Táhirih was held with presentations including Sahar Ansari, a professor of Urdu at the University of Karachi and Zahida Hina with the attendance of noted Pakistani poet, Jon Elia. Also in September a Baháʼí women's group decided to provide treats to students at a government school for physically and mentally handicapped children which evolved into the first set of volunteers helping in the school ever had. From December 1984 through July 1985, more than ten vocational or tutorial schools had been set up in several cities and run by Baháʼís or Baháʼí assemblies. Also in the early 1980s, Baháʼís in Pakistan started social and economic development projects like small-scale medical camps.

In the mid-1980s, Iranian Baháʼí refugees who had come to Pakistan began to arrive in other countries. The office attending to the refugees attracted visitors from governments and institutions including members of the United Nations High Commission for Refugees (LSHCR) in Islamabad and Lahore; an official from the Ministry of Justice of the Nelherlands; a delegation from Finland that included the Ambassador from the Ministry of Foreign Affairs, the Ambassador of the Embassy of Finland in Tehran, and three senior officials of the Finnish government; and the Australian Immigration Officer from Canberra. In 1985 the Universal House of Justice published The Promise of World Peace and in 1986 and the assembly of Hyderabad used the occasion of the International Year of Peace to sponsor a symposium on world peace and present the document to attendees. In 1989 Baháʼís from Karachi moved to and elected the first local assembly in Muzaffarabad while Baháʼís from Quetta sponsored a week long series of student competitions that were run in 11 schools in Baluchistan – each day different activities were run; The Elimination of Prejudice, national songs, a quiz game, and a drama contest were among the events held. In 1990 several individuals converted from an Ahamdi background to the Baháʼí Faith and formed an assembly. In 1998, when the Taliban authorities in Afghanistan arrested many Baháʼís, many fled to Pakistan but many were able to return by 2002.

== See also ==
- History of Pakistan
- Religion in Pakistan
- Baháʼí Faith in Asia
- Baháʼí Faith in Bangladesh
- Baháʼí Faith in India
