= Seven Martyrs of Tehran =

Notable historical persons

The Seven Martyrs of Tehran were seven prominent Bábis executed at Tehran in 1850.

After the Battle of Fort Tabarsi, mere adherence to the Báb could be sufficient to lead to a death sentence, as most famously in the case of the Seven Martyrs of Tehran, a group of seven prominent Bábis who were executed in public by beheading in February 1850. Comprising three merchants (including a maternal uncle of the Báb), two clerics, a leading dervish and a government official, the seven were all men of high social rank who could easily have saved their lives by seeming to deny their faith, but chose not to do so.
