= Mullá Husayn =

Persian Letter of the Living, the first person to profess belief in the Báb

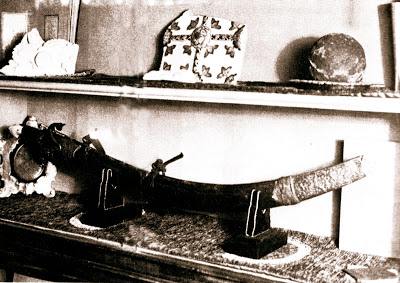
- Sword of Mullá Husayn used at the Battle of Fort Tabarsi alongside other Bábí and Baháʼí relics.
- Born: Muhammad Husayn Boshru'i; 1813; Boshruyeh, Iran
- Died: 2 February 1849 (aged 36); Mazandaran, Iran
- Occupations: Theologian and preacher
- Title: Gate of the Gate (Arabic: Bábu'l-Báb) Siyyid Ali
- Father: Hajji Mulláh Abdullah

Mullá Husayn (1813 – 2 February 1849) (Persian: ملا حسين بشروئي Mulláh Hossein Boshru'i), also known by the honorific Jináb-i Bábu'l-Báb ("Gate of the Gate"), was a Persian religious figure in 19th century Persia and the first Letter of the Living of the Bábí religion. He was the first person to profess belief in the Báb as the promised Mahdi of Islam and a Manifestation of God, founding a new independent religion. The title of Bábu'l-Báb was bestowed upon him by the Báb in recognition of his status as the first Bábí.

As a young man Mullá Husayn studied Usuli Shia theology, becoming an authorized member of the Shia clerical order at the age of 21. He later became a follower of the millenarian Shaykhi school, studying under its leader Siyyid Kazim Rashti and traveling to debate prominent Usuli clerics to gain support for Rashti's teachings.

After Rashti's death, Mullá Husayn led a group of Shaykhis who traveled in search of the Mahdi. On 22 May 1844, in Shiraz, Mullá Husayn became the first person to profess belief in the Báb as the Mahdi, and the first follower of the Báb's religion, known as Bábism. He was appointed as the first of the Báb's apostles, called the Letters of the Living. The anniversary of his conversion is celebrated annually as a holy day in the Baháʼí Faith.

As a Letter of the Living he served as a prominent Bábí evangelist and leader. His travels and public preaching were instrumental in spreading the religion throughout Persia, allowing him to come into contact with many prominent clerics and government officials, including Baháʼu'lláh and Mohammad Shah Qajar. He is often mentioned in Baháʼí literature as a paragon of courage and spiritual excellence. He led the Bábí combatants at the Battle of Fort Shaykh Tabarsi, and was killed in that battle on 2 February 1849. Mullá Husayn is regarded as a significant martyr in Bábism and the Baháʼí Faith and accorded a high spiritual station in both religions as the first to believe in the Báb and a prominent participant in the perceived fulfillment of many elements of Islamic eschatology.

== Biography ==
=== Early life and education (1813–1843) ===
Mullá Husayn was born in 1813 near Boshruyeh in the South Khorasan province of the Persian Empire to a wealthy and established family of the town. His name at birth was Muhammad Husayn; the honorific Mullá became associated with him at a young age, perhaps in recognition for a leadership role he took on as a child. It is not part of his given name. His father Hajji Mulláh Abdullah was a dyer; his mother was a poet known for her piety and knowledge. They had five children, of whom three would become significant Bábís.

Like most young boys of the era he received a minimal grammar school education at the local maktab (school) where he studied the Quran, reading, writing and basic arithmetic. Although he would later distinguish himself as a military leader, and traverse the entirety of Persia on foot multiple times, Mullá Husayn is reported to have been in poor health from a young age. Contemporary reports indicate that he received treatment for epilepsy and heart palpitations. A critic of the Bábí movement suggested that he received early training in swordsmanship, while childhood friends deny this, indicating he often had difficulty even with the physical exertion involved in lengthy writing sessions as a student and in his later work as a scribe and copyist.

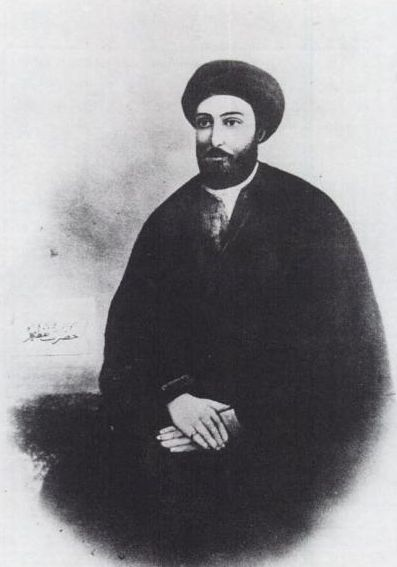
Mullá Husayn's teacher, Siyyid Kazim Rashti.

At the age of twelve he left school and pursued higher education in the madrasa (seminary) of Mashhad and Isfahan–which included lessons in Persian literature and the Qurʼan–while working to master the art of debate. Scholars have suggested that his family members practiced Ismaʻili Shiʻism, but in Mashhad and Isfahan he studied Muslim theology and jurisprudence under prominent teachers from the Usuli school. In Mashhad he studied at the madrasa of Mirzá Jaf'ar, which exists to this day as one college of the larger Razavi University of Islamic Sciences.

By 21, he had been licensed as an Usuli mujtahid (cleric), granting him the publicly recognized right to preach in mosques, take on students of theology, and issue fatwas (authoritative legal opinion). During his studies in Mashhad he became attracted to the teachings of the Shaykhi school of Shia Islam, founded by Shaykh Ahmad Ahsá'í and led at the time by his successor, Siyyid Kázim Rashtí. His interest in Shayki teachings seems to have emerged in Mashhad, but the exact origin of his interest is unknown; an early mystical bent and a desire to fuse scholarship with "inner knowledge" may have attracted him to the intuitive hermeneutical techniques used by the Shaykis. On the completion of his studies he was offered a position of religious leadership in his hometown, but declined. After a brief period in Tehran, in 1835 he traveled to the Shia shrine city of Karbala in the Ottoman Empire to study directly under Siyyid Kázim. His father had died by this point, but all the surviving family members except one sister—already married—chose to move with him to Karbala.

Siyyid Kázim taught his students to expect the fulfillment of the messianic expectations of Twelver Shiʻism in their lifetimes, particularly emphasizing that the Qa'im, or Mahdi, was already living. Mullá Husayn studied under Siyyid Kázim from 1835 until 1843, during which time he was often asked by his teacher to travel to Persia to debate publicly with orthodox Shia ulama to gain more widespread Persian support for Shaykism. During this period he wrote at least two books and gained a reputation as a significant student of Siyyid Kázim, being asked on occasion to answer questions on his teacher's behalf and gaining permission to supervise students of his own. He received a stipend from the school of Siyyid Kázim for work as a scribe and copyist. Baháʼí sources traditionally suggest that Siyyid Kázim entrusted Mullá Husayn with secret teachings which he did not share with the larger body of Shaykis—a claim which is evocative of his later role in Bábism, but difficult to verify.

Near the end of his life, Siyyid Kázim repeatedly instructed his followers to disperse throughout Persia and surrounding lands in search of the Mahdi. Following Siyyid Kázim's death on 31 December 1843 a significant number of Shaykis recognized Mullá Husayn as his only worthy successor, and expected that Mullá Husayn would declare himself to be the Mahdi, or at least take up the leadership of the Shaykis. He vigorously rejected both courses, and immediately set out in search of the promised Mahdi.

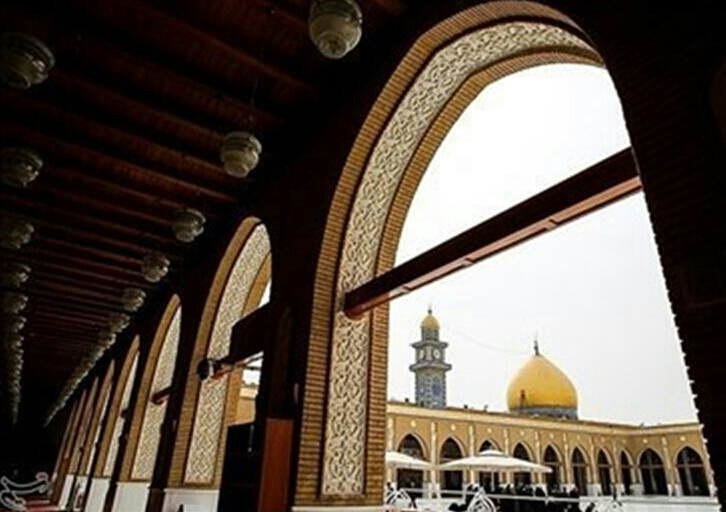
The Great Mosque of Kufa, where Mullá Husayn and his companions retired in early 1844

=== Search for the Mahdi (1843–1844) ===
Mullá Husayn, accompanied by his brother Muhammad-Hasan and nephew Muhammad-Baqir, set off from Karbala to Najaf and spent forty days in the Great Mosque of Kufa sequestered in a state of prayer and fasting. The Mosque in Kufa was chosen as the site of their retreat due to its association with the martyrdom of the Imam Ali; Shakyis often engaged in prolonged retreats as a method for developing discernment. After a number of days they were joined by thirteen Shaykis, including Mullá Aliy-i-Bastami, who accompanied them in spiritual preparation for their journey.

Near the end of the retreat, Mullá Husayn received a letter which appeared to have been written by Siyyid Kázim before his death; while his companions assumed that the letter contained an appointment from Siyyid Kázim naming Mullá Husayn as his successor, it contained only veiled instructions for the coming journey. Mullá Husayn is reported to have publicly burst into tears upon reading the posthumous instructions of Siyyid Kázim and realizing the enormity and uncertainty to his task.

After celebrating the Muslim holiday of Mawlid, marking the completion of forty days spent at the Great Mosque of Kufa, Mullá Husayn and his companions visited the Tomb of the Imam Ali in Najaf and proceeded toward Búshihr, on the Persian Gulf. After some time there, at Mullá Husayn's urging, they continued to Shiraz in the Province of Fars. At this point they had traveled on foot for approximately 600 miles with no clear intended destination and no guide for their journey except Siyyid Kázim's dying advice to Mullá Husayn. Upon their arrival in Shiraz, Mullá Husayn instructed his companions to proceed to the Vakil Mosque where he would join them for evening prayers.

The room where Mullá Husayn accepted the religion of the Báb on the evening of 22 May 1844, in his house in Shiraz.

=== Conversion to Bábism (1844) ===
In Shiraz, on 22 May 1844, he encountered Sayyed ʿAli Muhammad Shirāzi, the Báb, who invited Mullá Husayn to his home. On that night Mullá Husayn told him that he was searching for the Promised Mahdi and shared with him some of the characteristics expected of the Mahdi which he had learned from Siyyid Kázim. The Báb declared that he manifested all of the characteristics of the Mahdi. Mullá Husayn remained uncertain until the Báb had replied satisfactorily to all of Mullá Husayn's questions and had written in his presence, with extreme rapidity, a long commentary on the Surah of Joseph, which has come to be known as the Qayyúmu'l-Asmáʼ ("Maintainer of the Divine Names") and is considered the Báb's first revealed work. Siyyid Kázim had apparently—when requested by Mullá Husayn to do so himself—predicted that the Mahdi would reveal, unasked, a commentary on this Surah. Nabil's Narrative records Mullá Husayn's account of the signs he had been given by the dying Siyyid Kázim to recognize the Mahdi and indicates that Mullá Husayn was quickly convinced that the Báb satisfied these conditions. While the Báb had already revealed his religious mission to his wife, Khadíjih-Bagum and his household servant, Mubarak about a month previous, Mullá Husayn became the first person to independently recognize him as the Mahdi and the prophet-founder of a new religion, and was appointed as the first member of the Báb's "Letters of the Living" (Ḥurúfu'l-ḥayy in Arabic). The anniversary of this declaration is observed as a holy day by Baháʼí communities around the world and the beginning of the religions of Bábism and the Baháʼí Faith.

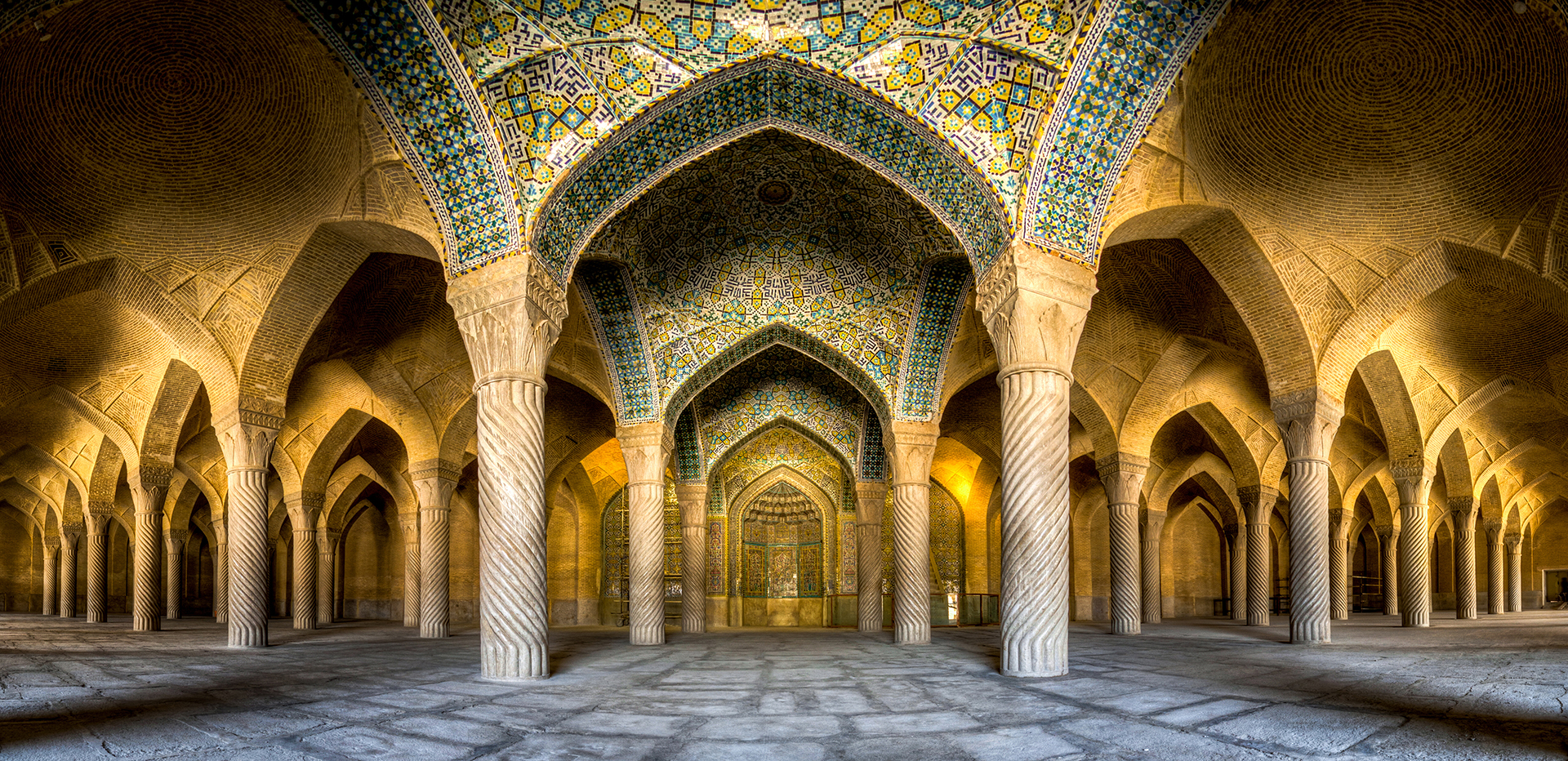
The Vakil Mosque, where Mullá Husayn preached and taught theology classes during his time in Shiraz.

=== Role as a Letter of the Living (1844–1849) ===
After his recognition of the Báb, Mullá Husayn was appointed as the first member of the Letters of the Living. The Báb forbade Mullá Husayn from actively spreading his newfound religion, and instead explained that seventeen others would have to independently recognize him as the Mahdi before he would allow the Bábi Religion to be openly spread. During his time in Shiraz, Mullá Husayn took up a teaching position in the Vakil mosque, where he gathered a large number of students which included notable clerics in Shiraz. During his lectures in Shiraz, he never directly referenced the Báb, but his regular meetings with the Báb inspired the content of his lectures. Within five months, seventeen other disciples of Siyyid Kázim had recognized the Báb as sent by God and joined Mullá Husayn among the ranks of the Letters of the Living. Among these first to convert to Bábism were Mullá Husayn's companions on his journey from Karbala to Shiraz: Muḥammad-Ḥasan Bushrú'í, Muḥammad-Báqir Bushrú'í and Mullá ʻAlí Basṭámí. The Báb addressed an epistle to each of the Letters of the Living and tasked them with spreading his religion throughout the country and surrounding regions.

When the Báb determined to leave Shiraz on pilgrimage to Mecca, he instructed Mullá Husayn to travel to Isfahan, Kashan, Qom, Tehran and Khorasan Province, spreading Bábism as he traveled. Nabil indicates that Mullá Husayn was displeased when Quddús, the 18th Letter of the Living, was chosen to accompany the Báb on his pilgrimage rather than himself. The Báb is recorded to have indicated that Mullá Husayn would discover an important secret in Tehran, and would be able to effectively defend Bábism against opposition in the other cities of his journey.

==== Isfahan ====
In Isfahan, Mullá Husayn began teaching in the Nimavar school and used his authority as a mujtahid and his reputation as a disciple of Siyyid Kázim to spread the new teachings of Bábism. He preached his new religion publicly and was reported to have drawn significant public attention:

In crowds they gathered to hear the teacher. He occupied, in turn, all the pulpits of Isfahán where he was free to speak publicly and to announce that Mírzá 'Alí-Muhammad was the twelfth Imám, the Imám Mihdí. He displayed and read his Master's books and would reveal their eloquence and their depth, emphasizing the extreme youthfulness of the seer and telling of his miracles.

— Arthur de Gobineau, Les Religions et les Philosophies dans l'Asie Centrale

He was opposed by some Shaykis and orthodox Shias in the city, but won the tacit support of the most prominent Mullá in the city and was able to continue preaching for the duration of his stay. A number of residents accepted the message of the Báb and converted to Bábism as a result of Mullá Husayn's teaching. In the writings of the Báb as well as later Baháʼí hagiography, the example of the first Isfahani Bábí, a wheat sifter of modest means, is often used as an example of the diversity of those who accepted the Báb's teachings and the corruption of the Persian religious elites:

In the land of Sád [Iṣfahán], which to outward seeming is a great city, in every corner of whose seminaries are vast numbers of people regarded as divines and doctors, yet when the time came for inmost essences to be drawn forth, only its sifter of wheat donned the robe of discipleship. This is the mystery of what was uttered by the kindred of the Prophet Muḥammad—upon them be the peace of God—concerning this Revelation, saying that the abased shall be exalted and the exalted shall be abased.

— The Bab, The Persian Bayán

In addition to the wheat sifter, a few prominent Siyyids in Isfahan were converted by Mullá Husayn.

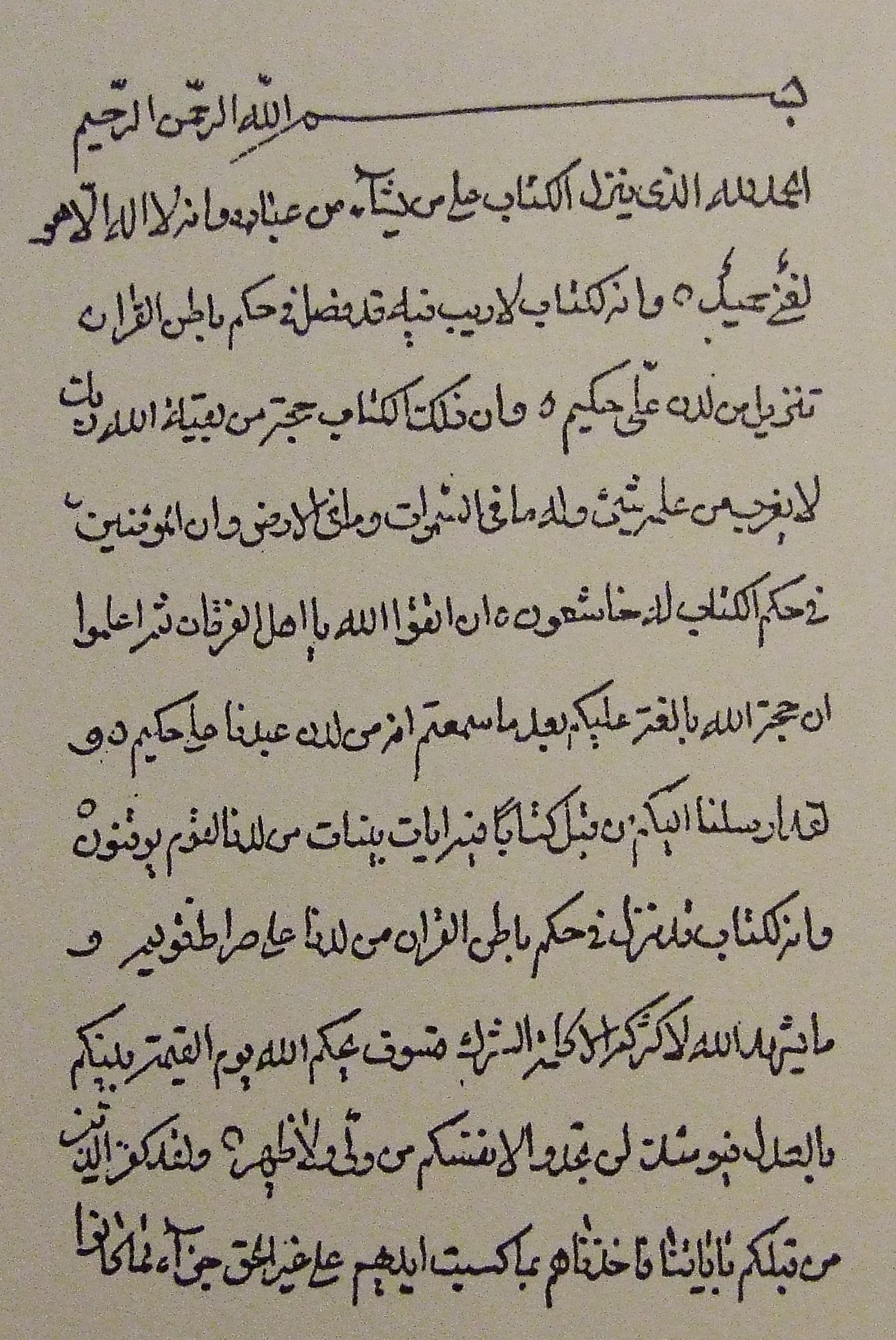
Some of the writings of the Báb in the handwriting of Mullá Husayn

==== Tehran ====
After his time in Isfahan, Mullá Husayn visited Kashan and Qom, spreading the teachings of the Báb in both cities. From Qom he continued on to Tehran, where he again made use of his mujtahid's license to take up residence in a local madrasa. As in Isfahan, he was opposed by members of the remaining Shayki community who felt he had abandoned his role as a leading follower of Siyyid Kázim to take up membership in a heretical sect. At the request of these Shaykis, he did not take up a formal teaching role in Tehran as he had in Isfahan, and spent little time in the madrasa itself during his stay. Gobineau reports that in spite of not preaching publicly in Tehran, Mullá Husayn was received by a number of prominent residents, including the king Mohammad Shah Qajar and his prime minister and shared the teachings and writings of the Báb with them in these private meetings.

In Tehran he befriended Mullá Muhammad-i-Mu'allim, a student of one of Mullá Husayn's leading opponents among the Shaykis in Tehran. Through Mullá Muhammad, he learned of the presence of Mírzá Ḥusayn-ʻAlí Núrí—the son of a prominent nobleman—in Tehran. At Mullá Husayn's request, Mullá Muhammad delivered a scroll containing some of the writings of the Báb to the home of Mírzá Ḥusayn-ʻAlí Núrí. Both Mírzá Ḥusayn-ʻAlí Núrí and his brother Mírzá Músá converted to Bábism as a result of this exchange. Nineteen years after the declaration of the Báb to Mulla Husayn, Mírzá Ḥusayn-ʻAlí Núrí pronounced himself to be the prophet-successor to the Báb, took on the title Baháʼu'lláh, and founded the Baháʼí Faith. Baháʼís regard Mullá Husayn's exchange with Baháʼu'lláh to have been a fulfillment of the Báb's promise that Mullá Husayn would discover a secret of great importance in Tehran. After receiving news of Baháʼu'lláh's conversion, Mullá Husayn departed from Tehran for Mashhad, in his home province of Khorasan.

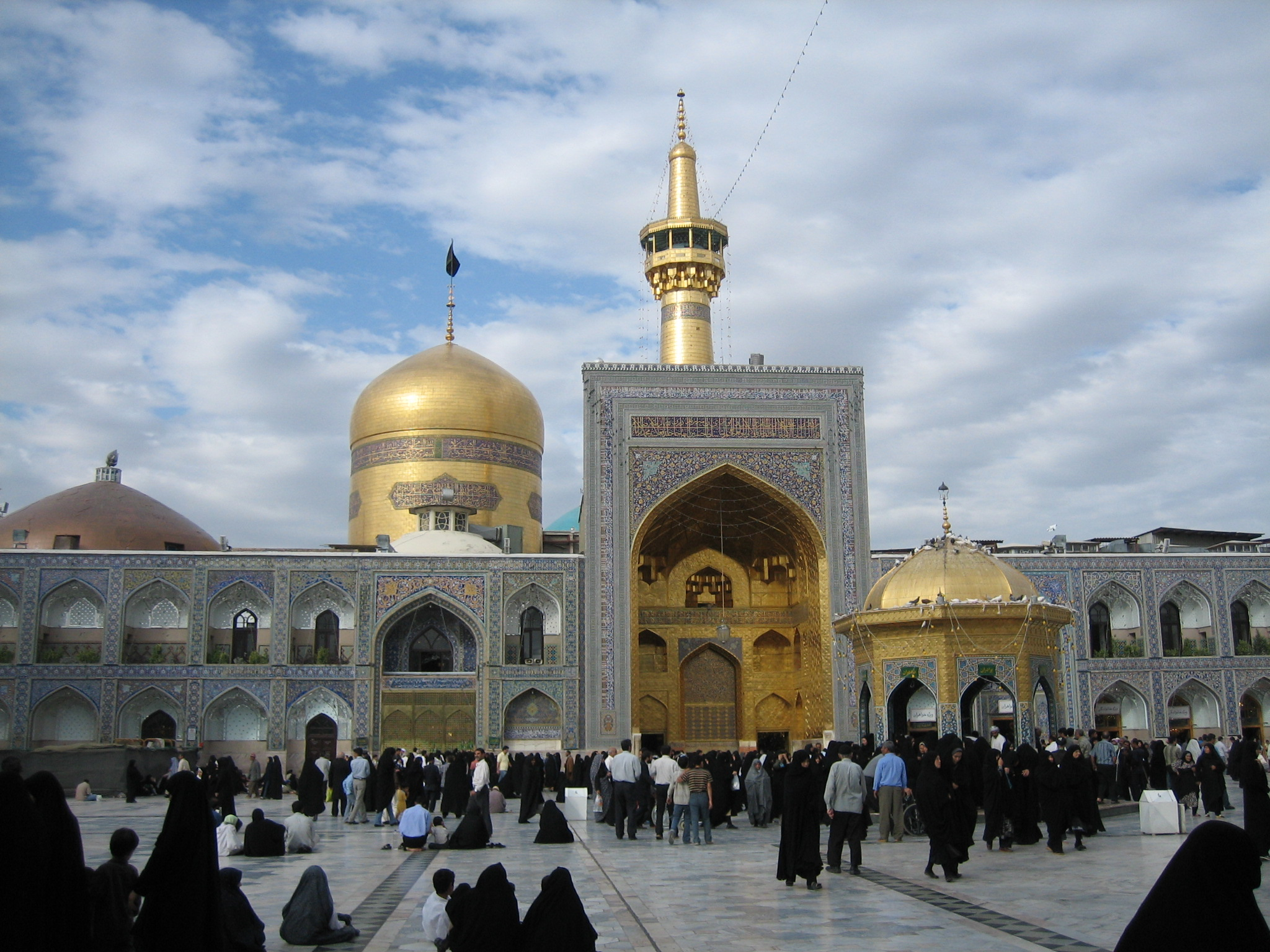
A modern view of the Imam Reza Shrine complex in Mashhad, which now contains the formerly freestanding Goharshad Mosque where Mullá Husayn preached.

==== Mashhad ====
As news of his preaching spread and the number of converts to Bábism continued to grow throughout the country, Mullá Husayn no longer arrived unexpected in new cities. In Mashhad, public debate about the religion of the Báb was already ongoing when he arrived, and the clergy had organized to debate and oppose him. He preached from the pulpit of the Goharshad Mosque in Mashhad and succeeded in converting a number of prominent ecclesiastical leaders of Mashhad through public debates and private audiences. From Mashhad, Mullá Husayn wrote to the Báb, sharing news of conversions in Isfahan, and Tehran, with particular emphasis on the conversion and subsequent evangelism efforts of Baháʼu'lláh.

==== Shiraz ====
In the spring of 1845 Mullá Husayn received news that Bábís wishing to visit the Báb after his return from pilgrimage had been instructed to gather in Isfahan. Mullá Husayn, currently en route to Karbala, met with a group of pilgrims and in Isfahan. After only a few days, he received news that Quddús and another prominent Bábí had been arrested in Shiraz after their pilgrimage with the Báb and publicly tortured and banished, while the Báb was under house arrest in the home of his uncle Hajji Mirza Sayyid 'Ali.

Along with his brother and nephew, Mullá Husayn made their way into Shiraz overnight in disguise. After making contact with that uncle of the Báb, the three of them were able to take up temporary residence in Shiraz and received permission to invite the Bábís gathered in Isfahan to gradually make their way into the city.

As the number of Bábís in Shiraz grew, opposition to the Báb and Mullá Husayn increased, particularly when the Báb began to give public addresses and sermons, and was engaged in debates by local clerics. The Báb eventually dismissed all the Bábís resident in Shiraz, including Mullá Husayn, whom he directed to return to Khorasan.

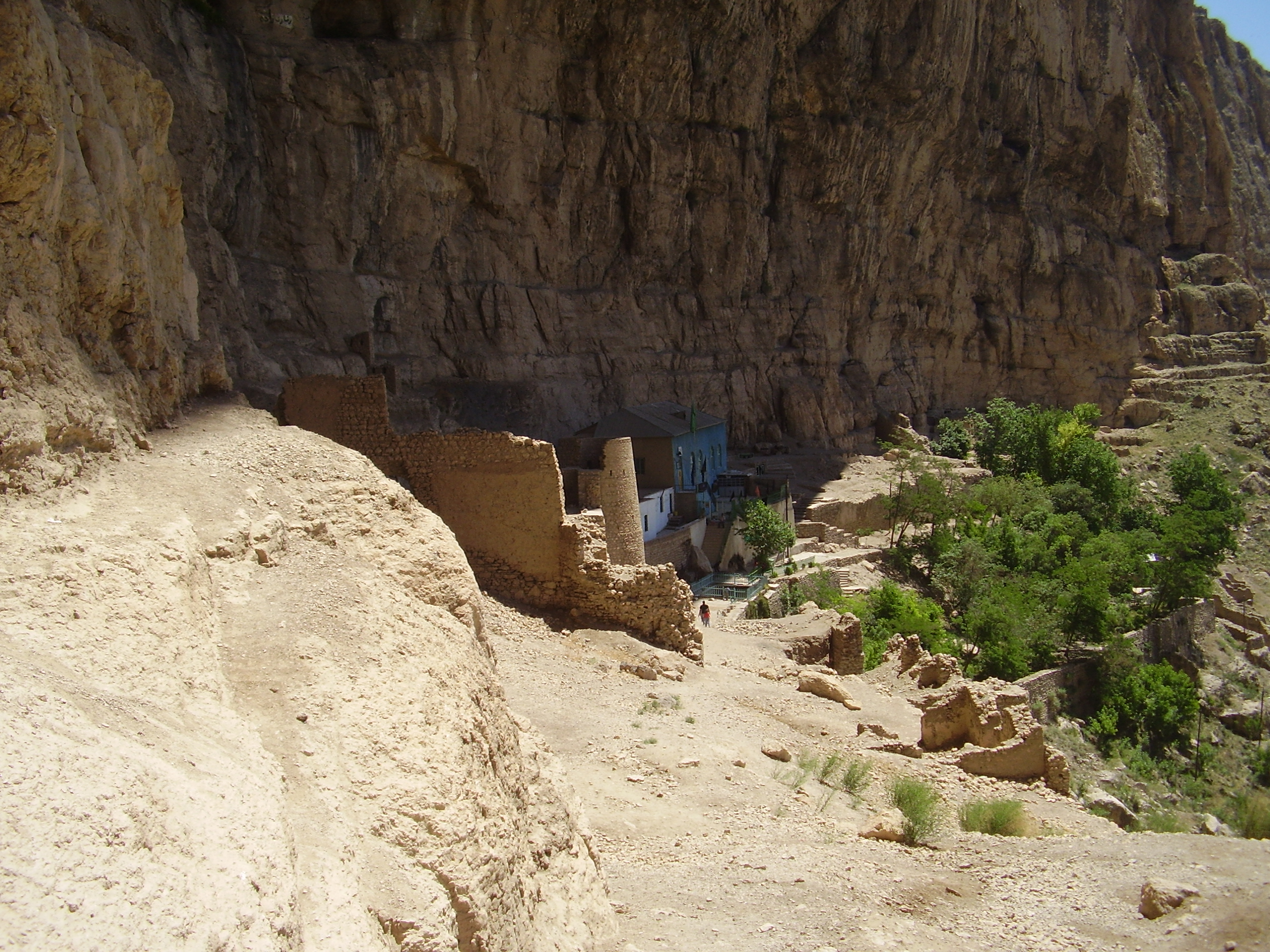
Fortress of Maku, where the Báb was imprisoned. The blue mosque sits on the location of the cell of the Báb.

==== Maku ====
After being directed by the Báb to return to Khorasan, Mullá Husayn continued spreading Babism in Mashhad and throughout the province. During his time in Mashhad, a rebellion against the government of the Shah broke out in Khorasan, involving an alliance between local Kurdish tribes and the sheriff of Mashhad. Mullá Husayn learned that the leader of the rebellion hoped to secure his support as a representative of the growing Bábi community, and decided on leaving Mashhad to avoid entangling the local Bábís in the chaos expected to result when the forces of the Shah eventually arrived. About the same time news arrived that the Báb had been arrested and imprisoned in the mountain fortress of Maku near the Turkish border, following the increased controversy surrounding the Báb who was sent from Shiraz to Isfahan and then being ordered to Tehran by the Shah. In early 1848 Mullá Husayn embarked on foot from Mashhad—on the eastern edge of Persia–to Tehran, with the intention of continuing on to Maku—located in the far northwest. On his journey he was solely accompanied by a Bábí servant named Qambar-Ali. In Tehran he was received by Mírzá Músá, half-brother to Baháʼu'lláh, and a group of local Bábís and met briefly with Baháʼu'lláh in a private interview. No known record of that meeting survives.

He arrived in Maku in March 1848, having walked over 2000 miles in no more than three months. In Maku, the Báb had originally been held under very strict guard, but after two weeks the government appointed frontier officer, ʻAlí Khán-i-Máh-Kúʼí, converted to Bábism. At the Bab's instruction ʻAlí Khán continued to carry out the Báb's imprisonment order, but allowed pilgrims to visit him and himself visited regularly. When Mullá Husayn arrived in Maku, he was welcomed by ʻAlí Khán, who reported having foreseen his arrival in a dream. On the first day of his time in Maku, the group of Bábís celebrated the holiday of Nowruz with the Báb.

Mullá Husayn stayed in Maku with the Báb for nine days, during which accounts report that the two cherished each other's company in the relative peace of imprisonment in a remote province. Mullá Husayn slept in the Báb's quarters and received pilgrims alongside the Báb during the days. Eventually the Báb ordered Mullá Husayn to depart for Mazandaran Province, reportedly offering parting instructions to Mullá Husayn and Qambar-Ali. In his parting address the Báb praised Qambar-Ali, comparing him to the groom of the Imam Ali, and lauded Mullá Husayn's courage and heroism; Nabil reports that the Báb promised Mullá Husayn that in Mazandaran "God's hidden treasure" would be revealed to him and Mullá Husayn's most important task would become clear. Mullá Husayn and Qambar-Ali left Maku carrying copies of significant works of the Báb which had been written during his stay in Maku, which they shared with Bábís during their journey to Mazandaran.

A few days after Mullá Husayn departed from Maku, he received news that by order of the Prime Minister the Báb was to be transferred to the castle of Chehriq.

==== Mazandaran ====
On his way to Mazandaran, he stopped briefly in towns with resident Bábis, sharing news of the Báb and encouraging the Bábis, who were facing increasing public opposition. In Tehran he again had a chance to meet with Baháʼu'lláh, who encouraged him in turn.

Mullá Husayn was received on his arrival in Barforush, Mazandaran, by Quddús, the 18th Letter of the Living. Although the two had met previously, they had never spent much time together and their last interaction had been tinged with Mullá Husayn's disappointment when Quddús was chosen to accompany the Báb on pilgrimage rather than himself. During his stay in Barforush he was a guest in the house of Quddús and was able to consort with the large number of converts and admirers Quddús had in that city.

Nabil reports that Mullá Husayn shared with Quddús the Báb's promise that in Mazandaran he would find a "hidden treasure which shall be revealed to you, a treasure which will unveil to your eyes the character of the task you are destined to perform." After reading some of the writings of Quddús, Mullá Husayn became convinced that Quddús himself was the hidden treasure that the Báb had referred to.Previously many of the Bábís had thought of Mullá Husayn as the most significant figure in the movement after Quddús; after this interaction Mullá Husayn constantly deferred to Quddús, going so far as to serve his meals and obey his instructions with a reverence previously reserved for those of the Báb. Quddús's role as the chief of the Letters of the Living was later confirmed by the Báb.

In Barforush Mullá Husayn engaged the leading Muslim cleric of the city in a public debate with the goal of either converting him or convincing him to reduce his public denunciation of the Bábis. After failing to convince him, Mullá Husayn–at the instruction of Quddús–left Barfurush to return to Mashhad once again.

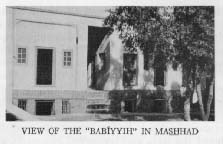

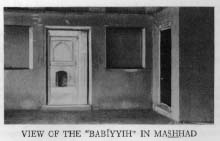
Views of the Bábíyyih constructed by Mullá Husayn in Mashhad

==== The Bábíyyih of Mashhad ====
In Mashhad, following the instructions of Quddús, he set out to increase the capacity of the Letters of the Living to engage in systematic preaching and conversion efforts. With the assistance of local Bábís he purchased a plot of land and erected a building intended to serve as a permanent residence for himself and Quddús as well as a center of Bábí preaching and community life. Shortly after its completion, Mullá Husayn and Quddús took up residence in the center–christened the Bábíyyih of Mashhad. The number of Bábís in Mashhad grew substantially in the next few months, and the Bábíyyih served as a center of organization for evangelism efforts throughout the region. Some sources suggest that the Bábíyyih may have been set up as early as 1844, but it does not seem to have come into use as a center of organization until 1848.

This period yielded a great deal of success for Mullá Husayn and Quddús, Bábí communities sprouted throughout Khorasan Province, including converts from a wide array of economic backgrounds. In Mullá Husayn's hometown of Boshruyeh, a group of 60 active Bábís had emerged, with thousands turning out to attend Mullá Husayn's sermons or pray with him. Widespread Shakyi sympathies among the local clerics seem to have laid a fertile ground for the growth of Bábism.

A few months after the construction of the Bábíyyih, a large number of Bábís gathered in the village of Badasht for the purpose of seeking consensus on the core spiritual beliefs of Bábism and making plans for how the Bábí community should respond to increasing persecution and the continued imprisonment of the Báb. The Conference of Badasht was largely organized and funded by Baháʼu'lláh, and Quddús and Táhirih were also major players in the conference — an event that would mark the declared independence of the Bábí religion from Islam. During the weeks before the conference, large numbers of Bábís travelled to Mashhad from around the country, angering city authorities to the extent that Mullá Husayn's personal attendant was arrested and publicly tortured in an effort to drive Mullá Husayn from the city.

Quddús left Mullá Husayn in Mashhad during the conference with the mandate of maintaining the work of the Bábíyyih in his absence. As the number of converts in Mashhad began to grow, opposition from secular and religious authorities increased to the point that Mullá Husayn was forced to leave the city before Quddús could return from Badasht.

Before departing from Mashhad, Mullá Husayn received large groups of visitors, along with approximately two hundred Bábí men who committed to traveling with him. Before they were able to leave the city, Mullá Husayn received a message from the Báb containing new directions. The Báb informed him that Quddús had been imprisoned in his hometown of Barfurush, and ordered Mullá Husayn and his companions to come to his aid. Further, Mullá Husayn was, in apparent fulfillment of Islamic eschatological predictions, to don the Báb's own green turban, and lead his companions under a black flag. The Báb also granted Mullá Husayn a new name: Siyyid ʻAlí. The granting of a new name was significant because the wearing of a green turban was forbidden in Shia Islam to anyone but a siyyid—a descendant of Muhammad through his daughter Fatimah.

=== Mazandaran Upheaval (1848–1849) ===
==== Skirmish in Barfurush ====
Mullá Husayn and his two hundred Bábí companions departed from Mashhad for Barfurush on 21 July 1848, and gathered additional followers along the way. On the third day, after a warning from Mullá Husayn about the danger of their mission to free Quddús, twenty members of the party left the group to return home. The group marched under a black banner prepared by Mullá Husayn which they raised in reference to the Black Standard, an element of prophecy in Islamic eschatology about the end of days.

The march was rebuffed outside the town of Barfurush by an armed group of residents led by the chief cleric. Mullá Husayn reportedly ordered his men to discard their possessions and at first made them withhold from engaging in battle, saying:

Leave behind all your belongings, and be content with your horses and swords, so that all may see that you have no interest in earthly things, and that you have no desire to guard your own property, much less to covet the property of others!

— Mullá Husayn, quoted in Nabil's Narrative

The first casualty of the encounter was Siyyid Ridá—Mullá Husayn's attendant—who was shot in the chest from a distance. After Siyyid Ridá's death, Mullá Husayn allowed his followers to begin defending themselves.

Although most sources agree that Mullá Husayn was physically weak and suffered from chronic illness, narratives of the battle depict him as an almost insurmountable combatant. One popular story from Nabil's Narrative describes him engaging the soldier who shot Siyyid Ridá and with a single blow of his sword cutting through the trunk of an intervening tree, the man's musket, and the soldier's body. A combatant in the Barfurushi force sent half of the severed musket by messenger to the Prime Minister as evidence of the Bábis' ferocity—attempting to allay criticism from the Prime Minister for failing to defeat an informal militia. The encounter was elegized by a number of poets throughout Persia.

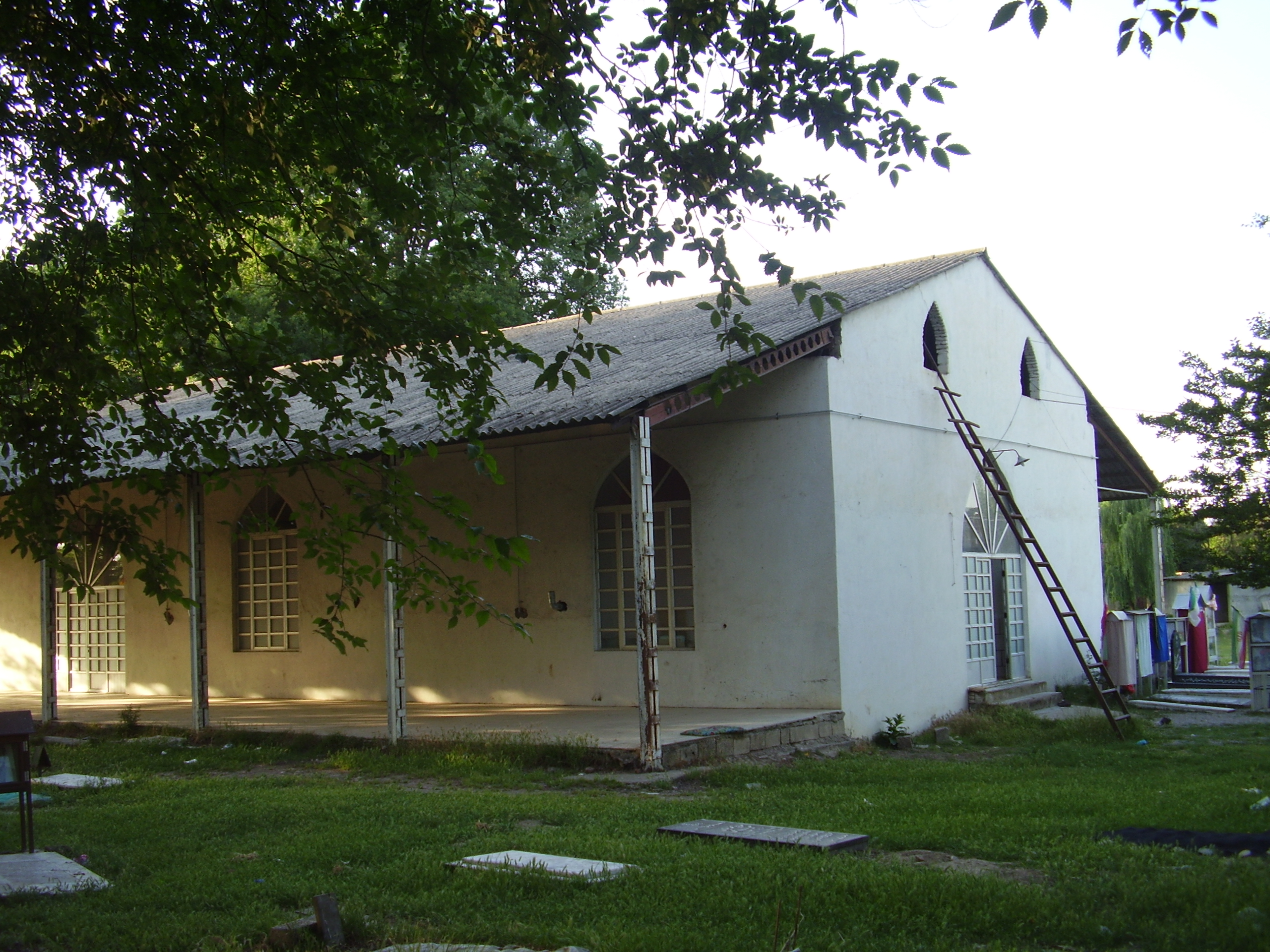
The Shrine of Shaykh Tabarsi

==== Construction of Fort Tabarsi ====
After the encounter at Barfurush the group constructed defensive fortifications at the nearby Shrine of Shaykh Tabarsi, a local saint. Upon arriving at the shrine, the Bábís, numbering a little over 300 according to Bábí and Baháʼí sources and according to court historians, were now under imminent attack from government forces, yet their numbers swelled to between 540 and 600 people as Bábís from the region streamed to their defense. The Bábí combatants represented almost every social class, including clergymen, merchants, craftsmen, and representatives of the landed nobility; the youngest was a twelve-year-old boy. The distribution of urban and rural participants has been shown to be roughly identical to the makeup of Persian society at the time, demonstrating the wide array of respondents to the religion of the Báb. Unlike at later Bábí upheavals where women would play a significant, or even majority role, all of the participants at Tabarsi were male.

At Tabarsi Mullá Husayn instituted a degree of martial order, centralizing food production, construction, and defensive duty. He appointed his nephew Muhammad-Baqir as his lieutenant. During their first day at Tabarsi they gained the patronage of a wealthy man from a nearby village who converted to Bábism and provided them supplies. With so many people to feed, the makeshift fort attracted a small collection of merchants from the region.

After the completion of the fort, the gathered Bábís were visited by Baháʼu'lláh, who inspected the fort and expressed his pleasure with the construction and organization. He advised Mullá Husayn to send a group of men to Sari, where Quddús was now imprisoned, to bring Quddús to the fort. Before leaving Baháʼu'lláh consulted with Mullá Husayn on some matters of strategy and expressed his desire to return to assist the gathered Bábís. Mullá Husayn sent seven men to Sari with instructions to return with Quddús; they did so with the willing consent of the cleric in whose home he was held. During the mission to retrieve Quddús, Mullá Husayn instructed the Bábís at Tabarsi that after Quddús's arrival they should regard Quddús as the commanding officer of the company, and Mullá Husayn only as his lieutenant. Upon his arrival, Quddús instituted a missionary element to the fort, sending representatives to the villages in the area and attracting a stream of new converts, many of whom took up residence in the fort.

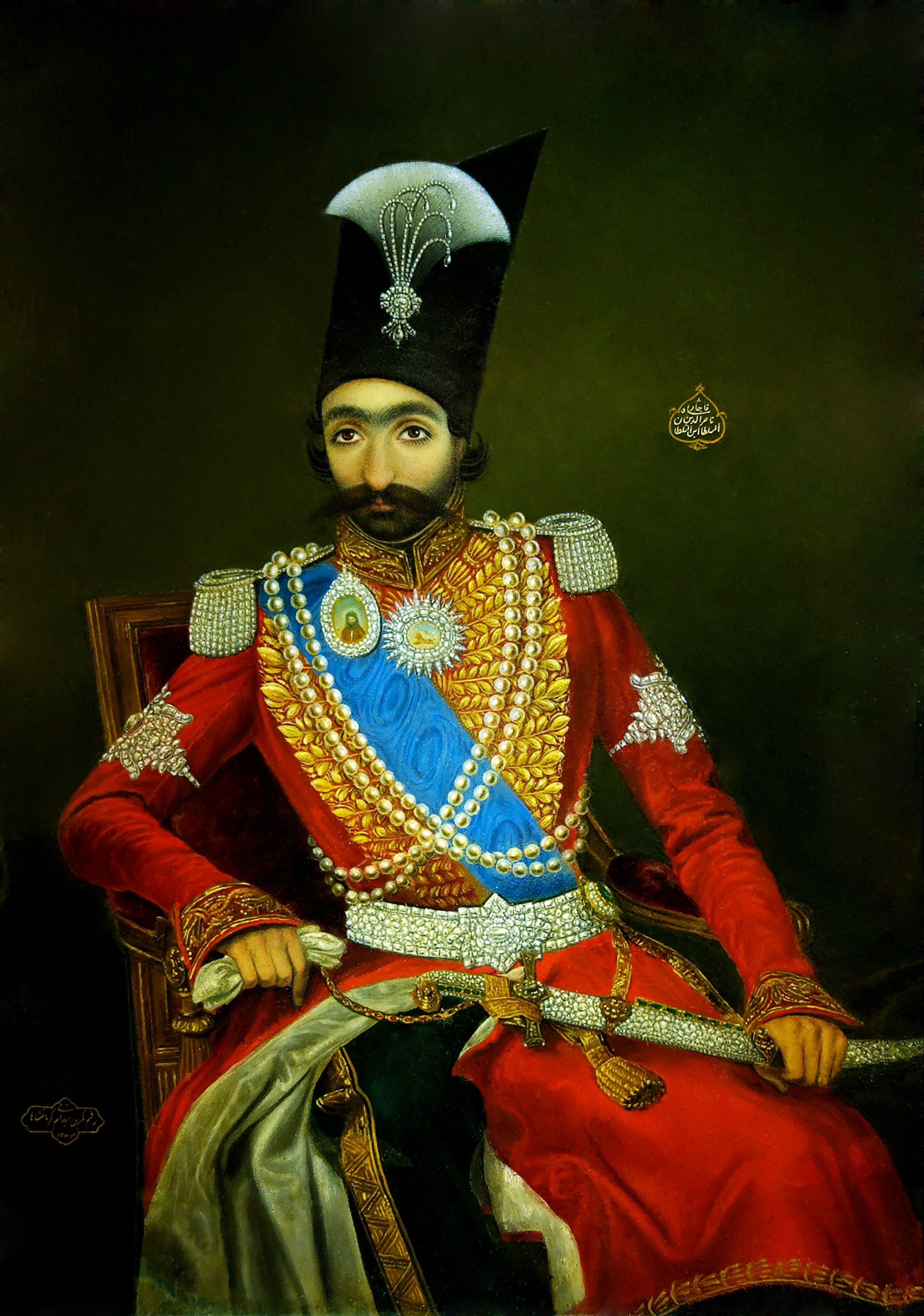
Naser al-Din Shah Qajar, King of Persia during the Battle of Fort Tabarsi

===== Army of ʻAbdu'lláh Khán =====
As conversions in the area increased, the chief cleric of Barfurush wrote to the Shah, indicating that a rebellion was underway in the region. Naser al-Din Shah Qajar, then only 17, had just taken up the throne after his father's death, and responded quickly to news of commotion in Mazandaran. He issued an edict authorizing a government official in Mazandaran, ʻAbdu'lláh Khán, to gather an army and quell the forces gathered at Tabarsi.

ʻAbdu'lláh Khán besieged the fort with twelve thousand men, and cut of their supply of water and food. Three days of heavy rain and snow followed his arrival, providing water for the Bábís and decimating the army's earth fortifications. ʻAbdu'lláh Khán and his officers took up residence in a nearby village to avoid the weather, and were absent when, on the fourth day of the siege, Quddús ordered the Bábís to disperse his army. The outnumbered Bábí's took the army by surprise and pushed them back to the village where ʻAbdu'lláh Khán was living, where they engaged and killed ʻAbdu'lláh Khán and every officer of his army. At this point Quddús ordered a retreat. Four hundred of the Shah's soldiers were killed, and around 100 of their horses captured by the Bábís. Upon returning to the fort, Quddús warned the Bábís that a larger, better organized army would come next, and ordered them to expand the fort. After this point, the fort walls reached ten meters tall, with a deep ditch surrounding it, a well for water, and tunnels and storehouses dug underground for refuge and storage.

===== Army of Prince Mihdí-Qulí Mírzá =====
After the defeat of ʻAbdu'lláh Khán, the Shah ordered a member of the royal family, Prince Mihdí-Qulí Mírzá to exterminate the Bábís of Mazandaran province. His edict to Mihdí-Qulí Mírzá is significant, because it ordered the death of the Bábís at Tabarsi, not only on the grounds of alleged rebellion, but also heresy:

It is true: Mihdí-Qulí Mírzá, you must exert yourself to the utmost in this affair. This is not a trifling amusement. The fate of our religion and Shiʻi doctrine hangs in the balance. You must cleanse the realm of this filthy and reprobate sect, so that not a trace of them remains. Devote your utmost diligence to this [...]

— Naser al-Din Shah Qajar, Edict to Mihdí-Qulí Mírzá, Governor of Mazandaran

In addition to authorizing Mihdí-Qulí Mírzá, the Shah ordered tribal chiefs and princes in Mazandaran to join their forces to Mihdí-Qulí Mírzá. He headquartered his forces in Vaskas and ordered ʻAbbás-Qulí Khán, the governor of Amol County, who was a distinguished general, to join him there with an army. He sent envoys to Barfurush and other villages to gain intelligence about the Bábís, and sent a messenger to the fort with instructions to speak with Mullá Husayn and Quddús.

The messenger was received by Mullá Husayn, and asked what grievances had caused the Bábís to rebel. Mullá Husayn repudiated the accusation of rebellion and claimed that they had no intention except to oppose the corruption of the ecclesiastical order of the country through debate and preaching the message of the Báb. Mullá Husayn then invited Mihdí-Qulí Mírzá and area clerics to visit the fort and hear his arguments for themselves before deciding to bear arms. The messenger was apparently moved by Mullá Husayn's description of the Bábí cause and agreed to carry his invitation back to the prince.

====== Battle of Vaskas ======
On 21 December 1848, three days after the messenger's visit, Mihdí-Qulí Mírzá's forces set out to attack the Bábí encampment. Nabil reports that he came with at least five regiments of infantry and cavalry. Quddús ordered every horseman among the Bábí's to rush forward and meet the Prince's forces before they could reach Tabarsi.

In the ensuing battle Mullá Husayn engaged the prince directly, after which the prince fled the battle, taking up residence in a nearby barn before retreating to Sari. At least two other royal princes died in the attack, and some prisoners held by the princes forces were released. Quddús was injured in the battle, but was not incapacitated.

====== Battle of Fort Tabarsi ======
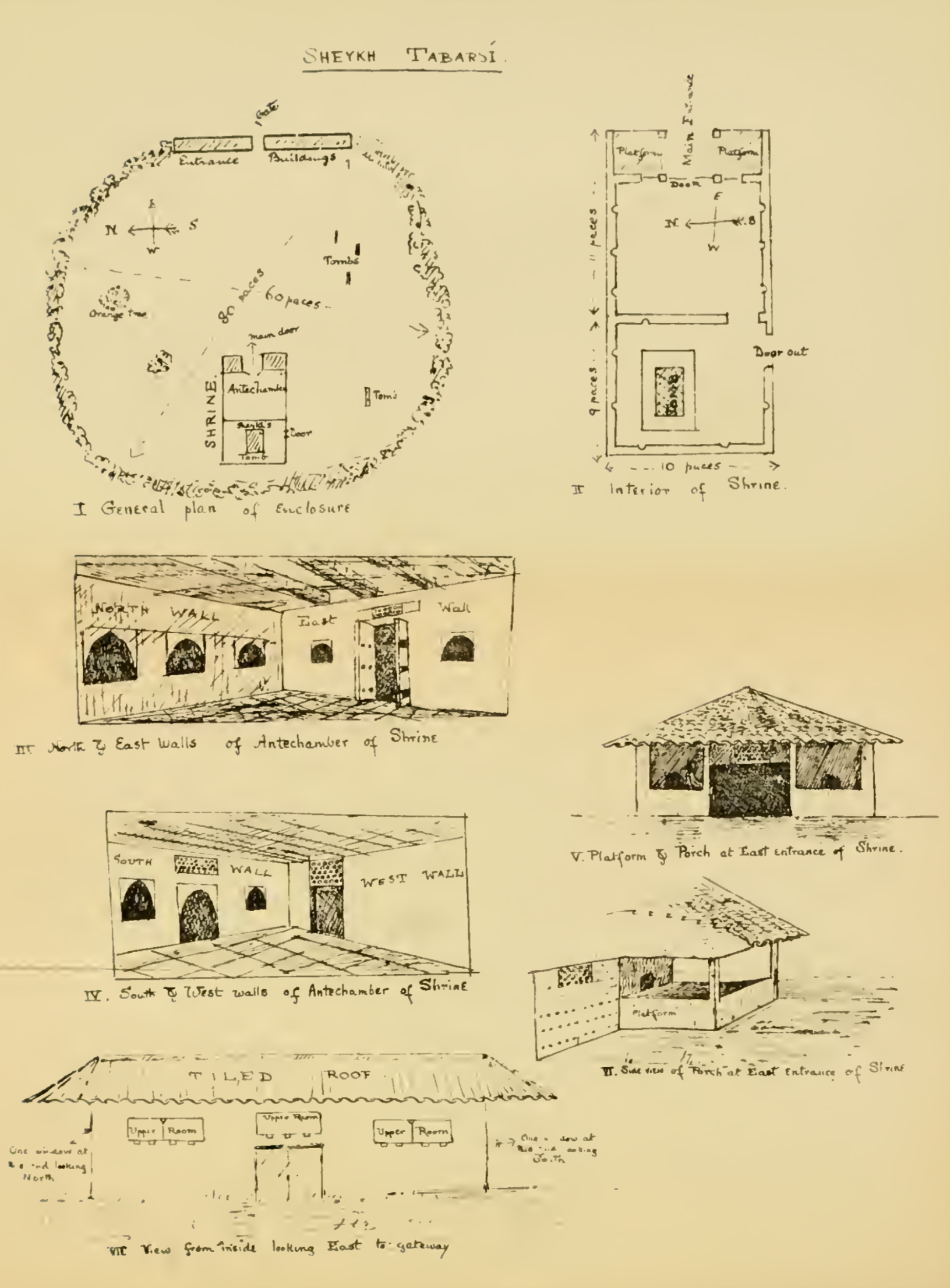
Drawing of the Shrine of Shaykh Tabarsi by Edward Granville Browne.

After the defeat of the Shah's forces at Vaskas, Abbás-Qulí Khán, governor of Amol County, took up primary responsibility for the eradication of the Bábís from the area. He solicited additional men from Mazandarani tribes and surrounded the fort. A more skilled commander than Mihdí-Qulí Mírzá's, he had barricades and artillery set up surrounding the fort, as well as again cutting off the water supply of the Bábís.

Mullá Husayn, inside the fort, oversaw the construction of a well within the walls. On 2 February 1849, he again donned the Báb's green turban, and—along with Quddús—launched an attack against the forces of Abbás-Qulí Khán. Eyewitness accounts record that the war-cry of the Bábís was "Yá Ṣáḥibu'z-Zamán!" or "Oh Lord of the Age", a reference to the Báb.Initially the Bábí thrust was successful in sowing confusion in the ranks of Abbás-Qulí Khán's troops, and a significant number of their tents and barricades were burnt to the ground. Mullá Husayn in particular is recorded running from side to side challenging enemy soldiers himself. His aptitude with the sword led Abbás-Qulí Khán to later compare him to the Imam Ali, traditionally regarded as the perfect swordsman, and his sword Zulfiqar, while Khán compared his martial leadership in the face of overwhelming opposition to that of the Imam Husayn:

The truth of the matter is that anyone who had not seen Kerbala would, if he had seen Tabarsi, not only have comprehended what there took place, but would have ceased to consider it; and had he seen Mullá Husayn of Bushraweyh he would have been convinced that the Chief of Martyrs had returned to earth; and had he witnessed my deeds he would assuredly have said 'This is Shimr come back with sword and lance.'

— Abbás-Qulí Khán, Quoted by Mirza Husein in the Tarikh-i-Jadid

During the battle Mullá Husayn's horse lost its footing, tangled in rope, and Abbás-Qulí Khán, perched in a tree, shot him through the chest. He survived long enough to be brought into the fortress, where he and Quddús spoke before he died. His last recorded words to Quddús were: "May my life be a ransom for you. Are you well pleased with me?" His nephew, the Letter of the Living Muhammad-Baqir was also present at the moment of his death. He was buried by Quddús—who dressed him for burial using one of his own shirts—in a grave to the south of the shrine, while thirty six other Bábís were buried to the north. Quddús gave a brief sermon at the burial calling all Bábís to see Mullá Husayn and the other dead as martyrs of exemplary character and bravery.

==== Death at Fort Tabarsi ====
Mullá Husayn died during battle on 2 February 1849, and news of this reached Turkey in a French language newspaper. He was buried within the grounds of the Shrine of Shakyh Tabarsi. Mullá Husayn is regarded by Bábís and Baháʼís as a martyr, and his conduct in the battle is characterized as an example of bravery and heroism in the face of insurmountable opposition in Baháʼí literature. Seven other members of the Letters of the Living are believed to have been killed at Tabarsi as well as the majority of the Bábí combatants.

=== Surviving family ===
His brother Muhammad-Hasan, survived until the end of the battle of Tabarsi, and was executed along with Quddús by the clergy, even though he was supposed to see the shah. His nephew Muhammad-Baqir survived until the end of the battle, although his fate after that point is unclear. Mullá Husayn's mother and sister had converted to Bábism at some point after the Báb's declaration—becoming close companions of Táhirih—and learned of his death at Tabarsi. They returned to their home town of Boshruyeh where they cared for the wives and children of men who had died at Tabarsi. After his mother's death, his family home was destroyed by a mob, and his sister was forced to move to Ashgabat. She became a Baháʼí and was given the title Leaf of Paradise (Varaqatu'l-Firdaws) by Baháʼu'lláh.

== Significance ==
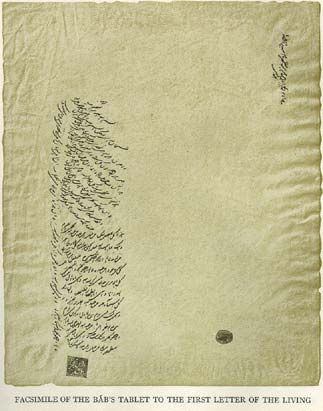
The Báb's tablet to Mullá Husayn, the first Letter of the Living

Mullá Husayn's role as the first to accept the Báb as the Mahdi and founder of an independent religion grants him a special place in Bábism and the Baháʼí Faith. He was granted the title of Bábu'l-Báb ("Gate of the gate") by the Báb, referring to this role. His expertise as a licensed member of the Shia mujtahidūn and a well-regarded disciple of Siyyid Kázim is seen as giving greater weight to his acceptance of the Báb, seemingly confirming that the Báb fulfilled the traditions of Shia Islam regarding the coming of the Mahdi.

Mullá Husayn's role as the first member of the Letters of the Living give him added significance in Bábí and Baháʼí thought. The Letters of the Living did not have specific administrative roles in Bábism, but played a role somewhat analogous to that of the Apostles of Christ: companions of the prophet, refiners of doctrine, and early martyrs. The Letters of the Living were described by the Báb as the return (Arabic: الرجعة rajʻa) of the Shia Infallibles:

The Eighteen 'Letters of the Living' manifested themselves in the last, i.e. the Muhammadan Manifestation in the persons of the Fourteen Holy Souls (i.e. the Prophet himself, his daughter Fatima, and the Twelve Imams of whom the first, 'Ali, was her husband, and the remainder of her descendants) and the Four Gates (or Bábs) who successively acted as channels of communication between the Twelfth Imam, or Imam Mahdi, and the faithful, during the period of his 'Lesser Occultation' …. The terms 'Point' and 'Letter; were originally suggested by the formula Bi'smi'llahi'r-Rahmani'r-Rahim (In the Name of the Merciful, Compassionate God), which contains 19 letters, the first (B) distinguished by a point or dot beneath it; and by 'Ali's alleged saying, 'All that is in the Qurʼan is ... in the Bi'smi'llah ... and I am the Point beneath the B.'

— Edward Granville Browne, quoted by Moojan Momen in Selections from the Writings of E.G. Browne on the Bábı́ and Baháʼı́ Religions

Mullá Husayn himself is described in the writings of the Báb and Baháʼu'lláh as the return of Muhammad, and in other early Bábí sources variously as the return of the Imam Husayn or even described as the "Qa'im of Khorasan". While Mullá Husayn is seen as the symbolic return of these historical figures, he is not seen by Baháʼís as a prophet or Manifestation of God. His raising of the Black Standard prior to the battle of Fort Tabarsi is seen as the fulfillment of Shia eschatological predictions, and further cements his station as an important part of Bábí and Baha'i claims of Mahdi-hood for the Báb.

The Báb describes Mullá Husayn with reference to the station known in Shia Islam as the "viceregent" or "silent one", similar to the role of Aaron in the time of Moses, and Ali in the time of Muhammad—one whose authority is great but entirely derived from a greater Prophet, in this case the Báb himself. He is further described as the first perfect Muslim, or the "first fruit of the Tree of Islam". In Bábí theology, it is the emergence of the first perfect follower of a religion which triggers the emergence of the next religion. In this way, Mullá Husayn is seen not only as the first Bábí, but in some sense the cause of the abrogation of Islam and its replacement with Bábism. The Baháʼí Writings refer to this role of Mulla Husayn:

Among them was Mullá Husayn, who became the recipient of the effulgent glory of the Sun of divine Revelation. But for him, God would not have been established upon the seat of His mercy, nor ascended the throne of eternal glory.

— Baháʼu'lláh, Kitáb-i-Íqán

Baháʼu'lláh also wrote a tablet of visitation for Mullá Husayn, which was included in an epistle written to Mullá Husayn's sister Varaqatu'l-Firdaws. In this tablet he plays on the common name of Husayn held by himself, Mullá Husayn, and the Imam Husayn, symbolically intermingling their identities and invoking their shared loneliness and suffering in the "path of God".
