= Battle of Fort Tabarsi =

1848–49 battle in Afra, Iran

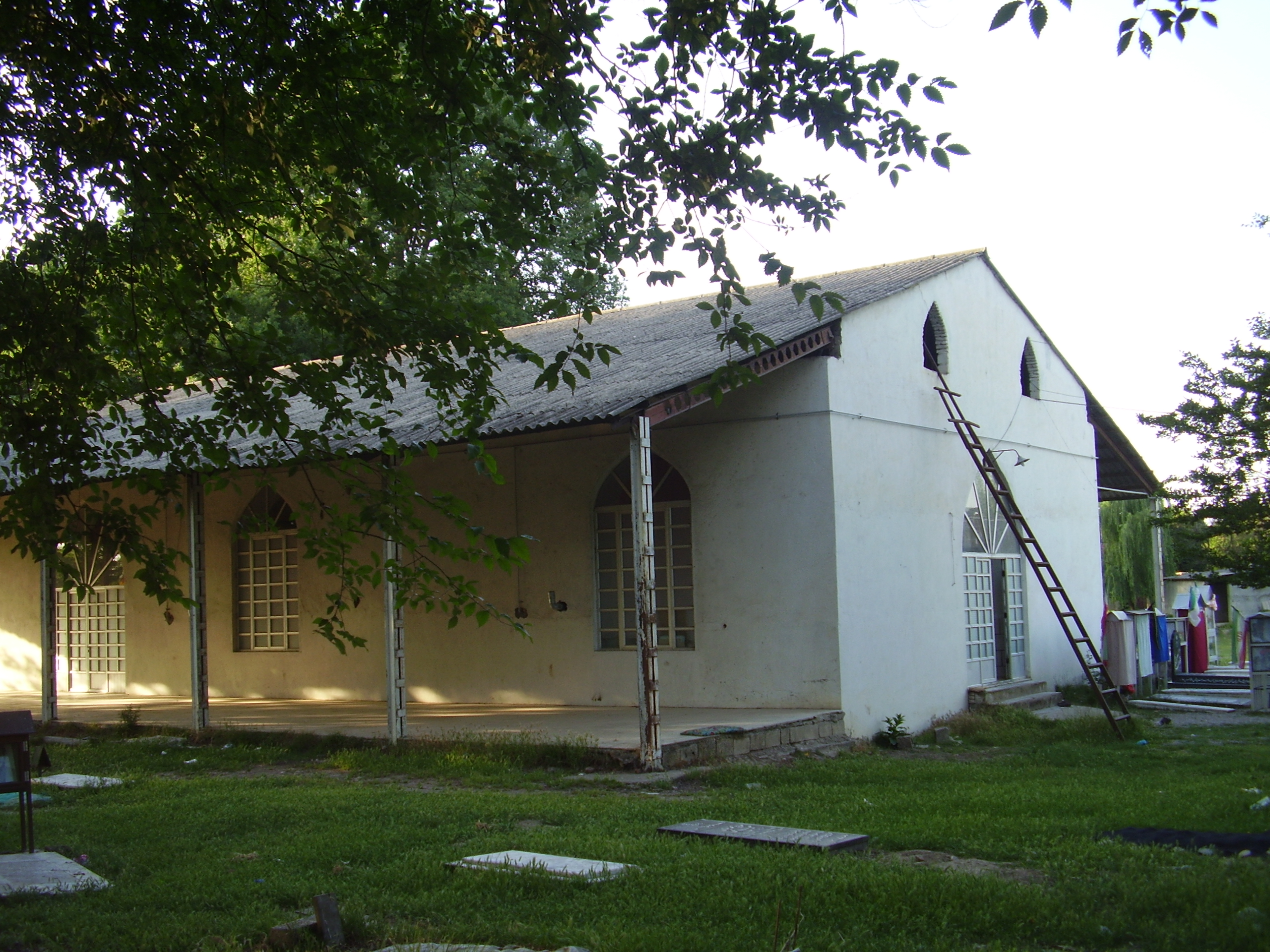
- Shrine of Shaykh Tabarsi in 2008
Date	10th October 1848 – 10th May 1849
Location	Afra, Iran
Result	Government victory

Belligerents
Qajar Iran	Babis

Commanders and leaders
Naser al-Din Shah Qajar	Mullá Husayn-i-Bushru'i †; Muhammad-Hasan-i-Bushru'i †; Muhammad-Baqir-i-Bushru'i †; Mullá Yusif-i-Ardibili †; Mullá Yusif-i-Ardibili †; Mullá Jalil-i-Urumi †; Mullá Ahmad-i-Ibdal-i-Maraghi'i †; Mullá Muhammad-'Aliy-i-Qazvini †; Quddús (executed) (Note: He was first taken prisoner than lynched by an angry Muslim mob in the city of Barfurush)

Strength
~10,000 (Babi claim)	600

Casualties and losses
0	All defenders were killed or massacred

The Battle of Fort Ṭabarsí was a battle between the forces of the Naser al-Din Shah Qajar and the Bábís over a period of seven months: October 10, 1848 to May 10, 1849, at the Shrine of Shaykh Tabarsí, in Afra, Iran. The commanding prince in charge of the government troops, unable to force the surrender of the followers of the Báb, resorted to a plan of betrayal to capture the remaining Bábís. The shrine is located in Mazandaran Province, Iran.

== Leading up to the Battle ==
Mullá Husayn-i-Bushru'i, one of the most prominent Bábís and the first person to accept the new faith, marched with 202 of his fellow disciples, under instructions from the Báb, from Mashhad to the Shrine of Shaykh Tabarsí with the Black Standard raised, fulfilling an Islamic prophecy. The mission was most likely proclamatory but possibly also to rescue another Bábí leader, Quddús, who was under house arrest in Sárí. After being attacked at the town of Barfurush (home of Quddús), the group took up making defensive fortifications at the nearby Shrine of the Shaykh. Upon arriving at the shrine, the Bábís, numbering a little over 300 according to Bábí and Baháʼí sources and according to royal court historians, came under escalating attacks from mobs, local government forces and then imperial regiments.

A scholarly review finds reasonable support for between 540 and 600 people present including over a hundred villagers who joined locally after those that arrived from across the country. A census of the Bábís who had traveled some distance to the Shrine shows 14 major former clerics of Islam, 122 minor former clerics of Islam, 12 nobility or high government officials, 5 wholesale merchants, 9 retail merchants, 39 guild tradesmen, 6 unskilled laborers, 6 peasants, and 152 unclassified. Different sources have some similarities of which cities/provinces they came from — the highest numbers coming from Isfahan, Boshruyeh, Miyami, and Bahnemir, though 33 locations are listed among the places of origin of the participants.

Sources describe the building of the fort as a matter of self-defence. The Bábí's spent many months under attack in the fort, resorting to eating the leather of their own clothes to remain alive.

== During the Battle ==
Over the weeks that followed, more and more Bábís joined their fellow believers at the fort with numbers rising to perhaps six hundred. Most notable of the late arrivals is Quddús, who joined after being released by Tabarsí Bábís on October 20.

Baháʼís see the battle as a heroic stand against oppressive government forces; it lasted seven months despite the few hundred Bábís being outnumbered by up to 10,000 troops.

On May 10, 1849, at last having been reduced to near-starvation by the encirclement, the Bábí defenders surrendered after a guarantee of safe passage from the government commander, including an oath sworn on the Quran — a guarantee that was immediately violated, with most of the members of the religion massacred on the spot after leaving the fort.

== After the Battle ==
It is believed that eight of the disciples of the Báb, also called the Letters of the Living, were killed in the series of battles:

- Mullá Husayn-i-Bushru'i
- Muhammad-Hasan-i-Bushru'i
- Muhammad-Baqir-i-Bushru'i
- Mullá Mahmud-i-Khu'i
- Mullá Jalil-i-Urumi
- Mullá Ahmad-i-Ibdal-i-Maraghi'i
- Mullá Yusif-i-Ardibili
- Mullá Muhammad-'Aliy-i-Qazvini

Quddús was taken prisoner in the city of Barfurush. There the leading Muslim clerics rallied the townsfolk into a vicious frenzy. Quddus was then left to the hands of the mob who beat him to death on May 16, 1849. What remained of Quddus' body was gathered by a friend and buried nearby.

The battle is considered the most important upheaval of the Bábí religion because the Báb himself instructed Mullá Husayn-i Bushru'i to initiate this sequence of events with raising the "Black Standard" as well as a call for support of the collective initiative of Bábís. The episode included two leading figures of the religion in Mulla Husayn and Quddús and overall nine out of eighteen of the Letters of the Living, and actually received a widespread response across the country. No other upheaval the Bábís suffered had this amount of importance attached to it.

The battle was also followed and mentioned in French language newspaper accounts from the Journal de Constantinople in March 1849.

== See also ==
- Conference of Badasht one of the other major events of the Bábí period.
- Seven Martyrs of Tehran

== Bibliography ==
- Amanat, Abbas (1989). Resurrection and Renewal. Cornell University Press, 124 Roberts Place, Ithaca, New York 14850. ISBN 978-0-8014-2098-6.
- Mehrabkhani, Ruhu'llah (1987). Mulla Husayn: Disciple at Dawn. Los Angeles: Kalimát Press. ISBN 978-0-933770-37-9.
- Nabíl-i-Zarandí (1932). Shoghi Effendi (Translator) (ed.). The Dawn-Breakers: Nabíl's Narrative (Hardcover ed.). Wilmette, Illinois, USA: Baháʼí Publishing Trust. ISBN 978-0-900125-22-5. ;
- Smith, Peter (1999). A Concise Encyclopedia of the Baháʼí Faith. Oxford, UK: Oneworld Publications. ISBN 978-1-85168-184-6.
- Zabihi-Moghaddam, Siyamak (2002). "The Babi-State Conflict at Shaykh Tabarsi". Iranian Studies. 35 (1–3): 87–112. doi:10.1080/00210860208702012. S2CID 154374391.
