= Letters of the Living =

Title given by the Báb to his first eighteen disciples

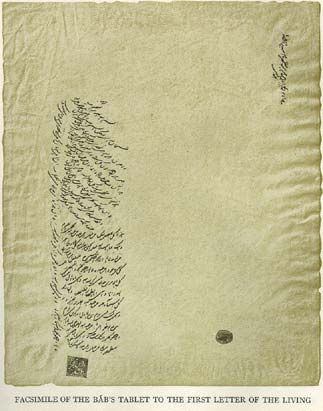
The Báb's tablet to the first Letter of the Living, Mullá Husayn

The Letters of the Living (Arabic: حروف الحي) was a title provided by the Báb to the first eighteen disciples of the Bábí Religion. In some understandings the Báb places himself at the head of this list (as the first letter). In this article, the former notation will be used except when specifically said otherwise.

== Mystical meaning ==
The Báb named the first eighteen believers in his mission as the Letters of the Living (Ḥurúfu'l-ḥayy in Arabic). One of the Báb's titles was the "Primal Point" (nuqti-yi-úlá). As Baháʼí scholar Moojan Momen explains:

The Eighteen 'Letters of the Living' manifested themselves in the last, i.e. the Muhammadan Manifestation in the persons of the Fourteen Holy Souls (i.e. the Prophet himself, his daughter Fatima, and the Twelve Imams of whom the first, 'Ali, was her husband, and the remainder of her descendants) and the Four Gates (or Bábs) who successively acted as channels of communication between the Twelfth Imam, or Imam Mahdi, and the faithful, during the period of his 'Lesser Occultation' .... The terms 'Point' and 'Letter; were originally suggested by the formula Bi'smi'llahi'r-Rahmani'r-Rahim (In the Name of the Merciful, Compassionate God), which contains 19 letters, the first (B) distinguished by a point or dot beneath it; and by 'Ali's alleged saying, 'All that is in the Qurʼan is ... in the Bi'smi'llah ... and I am the Point beneath the B.'

The 19 letters of the Basmala are (note Arabic is "read" right to left): ب س م ا ل ل ه ا ل ر ح م ن ا ل ر ح ي م. ((in English) m y h r l a n m h r l a h l l a m s b.)

Additionally, the Báb says:

...the Five Letters of Hell-Fire when separated become 19, as God says: 'Over it (Hell) are Nineteen';^{[Quran 74:30]} and so also the Letters in the Five Letters of Affirmation are nineteen.

[- And Momen comments:] "i.e. Muhammad, 'Ali, Fatima, Hasan, Husayn, which together contain 19 letters in Arabic."

The title "Point" may also refer to the divine and worldly aspects of the Manifestation of God, similar to the geometric point, which is without specific dimension and connects the physical with the nonphysical world.

The term "Hayy" means The Living and is used as one of the names of God in Islamic and Bábí scriptures.

In addition to the 19 letters themselves, in the Abjad numerals system the letters of the Arabic alphabet are assigned numerical values. The Arabic letters h ح and y ي, which compose the Arabic singular adjective meaning "living" in the phrase Letters of the Living, add up to 18, and therefore the phrase Letters of the Living refers to the number 18. There is a similar symbolism about the numerical value of the corresponding Hebrew word in Judaism.

The Báb referred to the 18 Letters of the Living, along with himself, as the first Váḥid of the Bayán Dispensation. In the Abjad numerical value of the word Wáḥid (واحد) is 19. The word Wáḥid means "One". The Báb used this term as a reference to God and his Manifestations.

== The Letters ==
The Letters are listed here in the order given by Nabíl in The Dawn-Breakers, and supported by Qatíl al-Karbalá'í except where indicated:

=== Mullá Hụsayn ===
First Letter of the Living, present at the night of the Declaration of the Báb celebrated as a holy day by Baháʼís, and who died at Battle of Fort Tabarsi.

=== Muḥammad-Ḥasan Bus͟hrú'í ===
Muḥammad-Ḥasan Bus͟hrú'í was the second Letter of the Living, and the brother of Mullá Husayn. He, his sons, Muḥammad-Báqir Bus͟hrú'í, and Mullá Ḥusayn travelled to Shiraz in search of the Qá'im; where the Báb revealed his message.

He was killed during the Battle of Fort Tabarsi. Bábís consider him a martyr.

=== Muḥammad-Báqir Bus͟hrú'í ===
Muḥammad-Báqir Bus͟hrú'í was the third Letter of the Living, and the nephew of Mullá Husayn. He and Muḥammad-Ḥasan Bus͟hrú'í (his father) travelled with his uncle Mullá Ḥusayn to Shiraz in search of the Qá'im where the Báb revealed his message.

He was killed in the fighting at the Battle of Fort Tabarsi. Bábís consider him a martyr.

=== Mullá ʻAlí Basṭámí ===
The first Bábí martyr.

=== Mullá K͟hudá-Bak͟hs͟h Qúc͟hání ===
Later named Mullá ʻAlí(*) "He died a natural death, but his son Mashiyyatu'llah later met with martyrdom in his youth." (H.M. Balyuzi, The Bab - The Herald of the Day of Days, p. 27)

=== Mullá Ḥasan Bajistání ===
Mullá Ḥasan Bajistání was the sixth Letter of the Living.

=== Siyyid Ḥusayn Yazdí ===
Siyyid Ḥusayn Yazdí was the seventh Letter of the Living. He is known as the Báb's amanuensis who shared his imprisonment in Maku and then Chihriq. In the story of the Báb's execution, he is the secretary that the Báb spoke to before being taken away to be shot.

Siyyid Ḥusayn Yazdí was executed in Tehran in 1852 in the aftermath on the attempt on the Shah's life.

=== Mullá Muḥammad Rawḍih-K͟hán Yazdí ===
He remained apart from other Bábís and was generally known as a Shaykhi. But he never renounced his faith and taught it whenever he could. (H.M. Balyuzi, The Bab - The Herald of the Day of Days, p. 27)

=== Saʻíd Hindí(*) ===
According to the official website of the Baháʼís of Pakistan, Saʻíd Hindí was a native of Multan, in present-day Pakistan. He was one of the students of Siyyid Kazim Rashti in Iraq. Saʻíd Hindí met the Báb after He declared His mission in 1844. The Báb sent him to India to announce the news of His advent. Saʻíd Hindí reached Multan in that very year to share the Báb's message with his fellow countrymen. Sayyid Basir Hindí, one of Saʻíd Hindí's contacts and a blind man of Sufi background from the Multan area, embraced the Bábí Faith and set out on pilgrimage to Shiraz in Iran to meet the Báb.

=== Mullá Maḥmud K͟hu'í ===
He was killed at Battle of Fort Tabarsi.

=== Mullá (ʻAbdu'l-)Jalíl Urúmí (Urdúbádí) ===
He was killed at Battle of Fort Tabarsi.

=== Mullá Aḥmad-i-Ibdál Marág͟hi'í ===
He was killed at Battle of Fort Tabarsi.

=== Mullá Báqir Tabrízí ===
Mullá Báqir Tabrízí was the Thirteenth Letter of the Living. He survived all of the other Letters of the Living. He was the only Letter to embrace the Cause of Baháʼu'lláh, and remain devoted and loyal to Him.

He received a letter from the Báb saying he would attain "Him whom God shall make manifest" in the year 'eight' (1268 AH). Soon after Baháʼu'lláh's release from the Siyáh-Chál of Tehran, Mullah Baqir obtained His presence and quickly became a believer and teacher of the Cause. Most of his teaching with was based in Adhirbayjan.

He died in Istanbul in around 1881.

- A tablet written to Mullá Baqir-i-Tabrizi - Translator has included a short biographical stub

=== Mullá Yúsuf Ardibílí(*) ===
Mullá Yúsuf Ardibílí was the fourteenth Letter of the Living.

He was killed in the fighting at the Battle of Fort Tabarsi. Bábís consider him a martyr.

- Glossary of the Kitáb-i-Íqán - includes a small biography of Mullá Yusif-i-Ardibili

=== Mullá Muḥammad-ʻAlí Qazvíní ===
Ṭáhirih's brother-in-law. Killed at Battle of Fort Tabarsi.

=== Quddús ===
He was the eighteenth and last Letter of the Living. He was chosen by the Báb to accompany Him to pilgrimage in Mecca and Medina. And was the cousin to the first letter of the living, Mullá Husayn.

(*) - Not included in the list provided by Qatíl which was created far earlier. He does not however provide alternatives and leaves the count at fourteen.

Although the Báb seems to have written a tablet to each of the letters, the names are not on any of them so the identities cannot be confirmed.

Of these the most distinguished are Mullá Ḥusayn, Ṭáhirih and Quddús. Ṭáhirih is singled out because she is the only woman and recognised the Báb without even meeting him. She sent a letter of belief through her brother-in-law and was sure he would find the Báb.

== Disputed Claims about Membership in Letters of the Living ==
In the introduction to A Traveller's Narrative (page xvi), Edward Granville Browne wrote that Mírzá Yaḥyá was the fourth of the Letters of the Living, and also mentioned Baháʼu'lláh as included in the group. However, this assertion was not claimed by any Baháʼí or academic sources, and Browne does not include any other details. The commonly accepted view is that Mulla Ḥusayn's brother and nephew recognised the Báb shortly after him (making them the third and fourth Letters). It is notable that Mírzá Yaḥyá would have been 12, or perhaps 13 at the declaration of the Báb.

== See also ==
- Muqatta'at, abbreviated letters of the Qurʼan
