= Nur, Iran =

City in Mazandaran province, Iran

Nur Persian: نور
- City
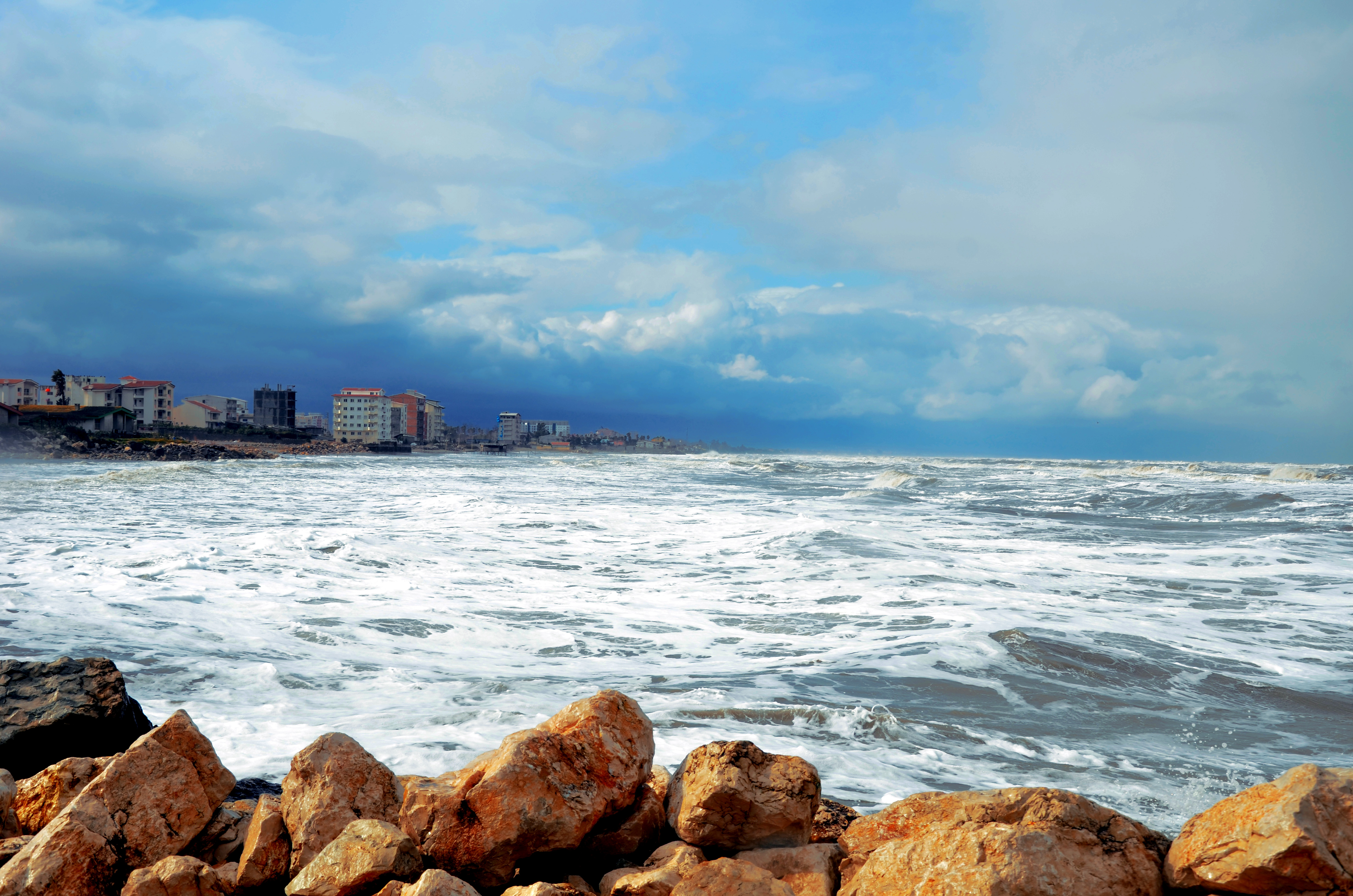
- Caspian Sea at the city of Nur

- Location within Iran
- Coordinates: 36°34′31″N 52°00′21″E
- Country: Iran
- Province: Mazandaran
- County: Nur
- District: Central

Population (2016)
  - Total: 26,947
- Time zone: UTC+3:30 (IRST)

Nur (Persian: نور) or Noor and Nour (Note: Also romanized as Noor, Nour, and Nūr; also known as Nursar (نورسر); formerly Suldeh) is a city in the Central District of Nur County, Mazandaran province, Iran, serving as capital of both the county and the district. It is on the Caspian Sea.

== Demographics ==
=== Population ===
At the time of the 2006 National Census, the city's population was 21,806 in 6,164 households. The following census in 2011 counted 22,978 people in 6,815 households. The 2016 census measured the population of the city as 26,947 people in 8,597 households.

== Overview ==
Nur is one of the oldest cities of Mazandaran province. Located on the Caspian Sea coast, it derives its name from Nur County, of which it is the administrative seat. Nur was considered one of the districts of Amol County until 1950. In the past, Nur was reputedly known as Suldeh and is one of the ancient cities of Mazandaran. Nur Forest Park, the largest forest park in the West Asia with an area about 4000 hectares and a variety of plant species, is located in this region.

== Notable people ==
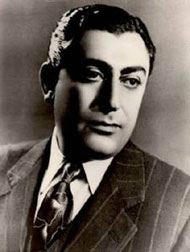
Gholam Hossein Banan

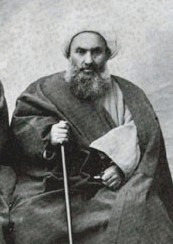
Sheikh Fazlullah Nuri

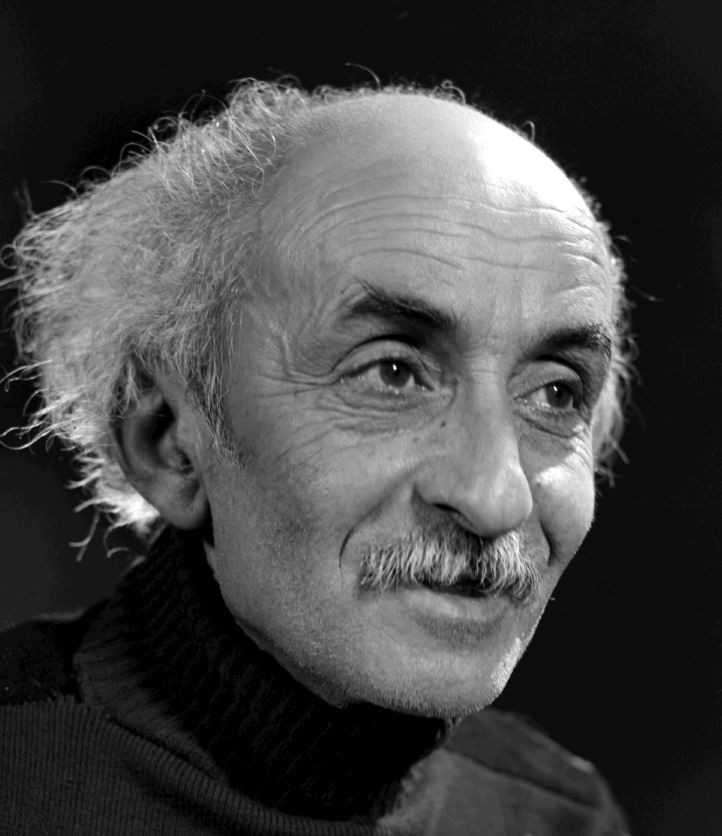
Nima Yushij

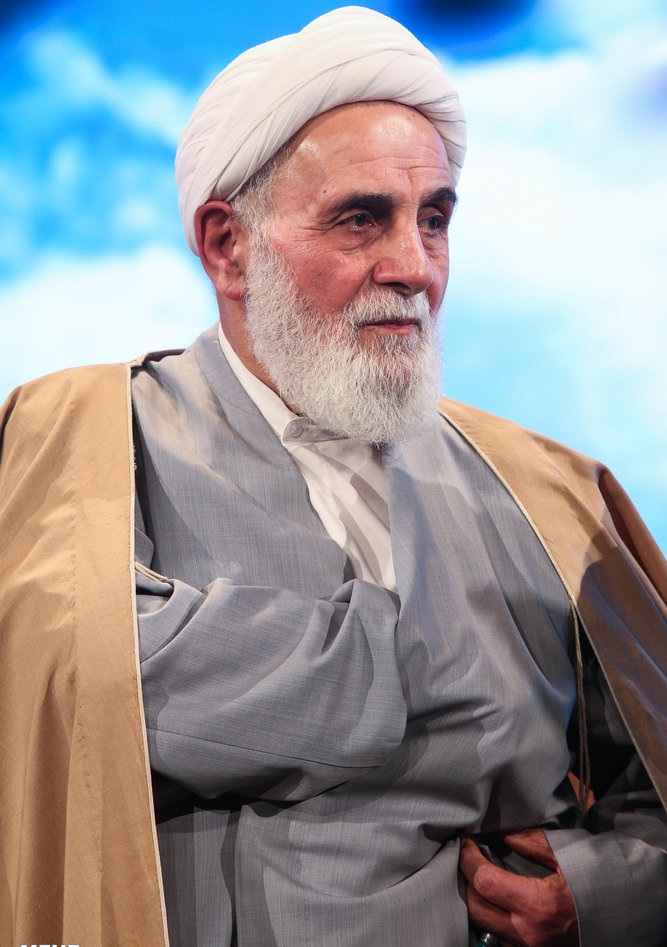
Ali Akbar Nategh-Nuri

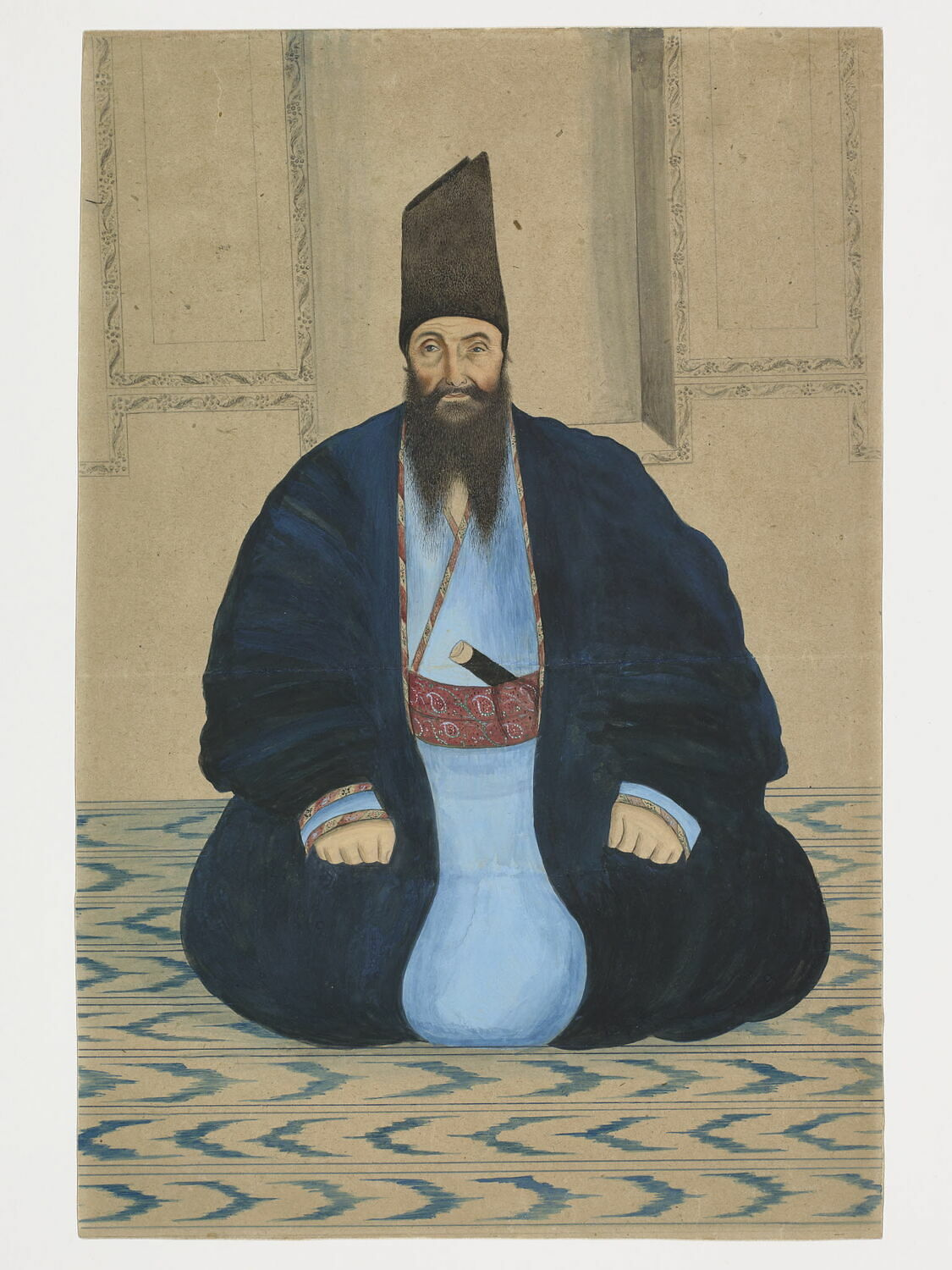
Mirza Aqa Khan Nuri

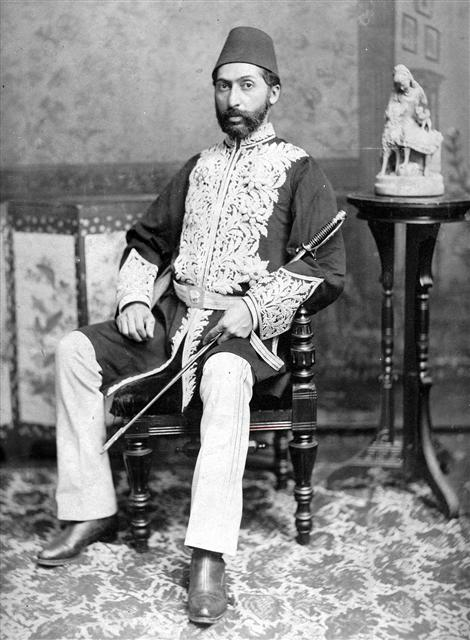
Haji Washington

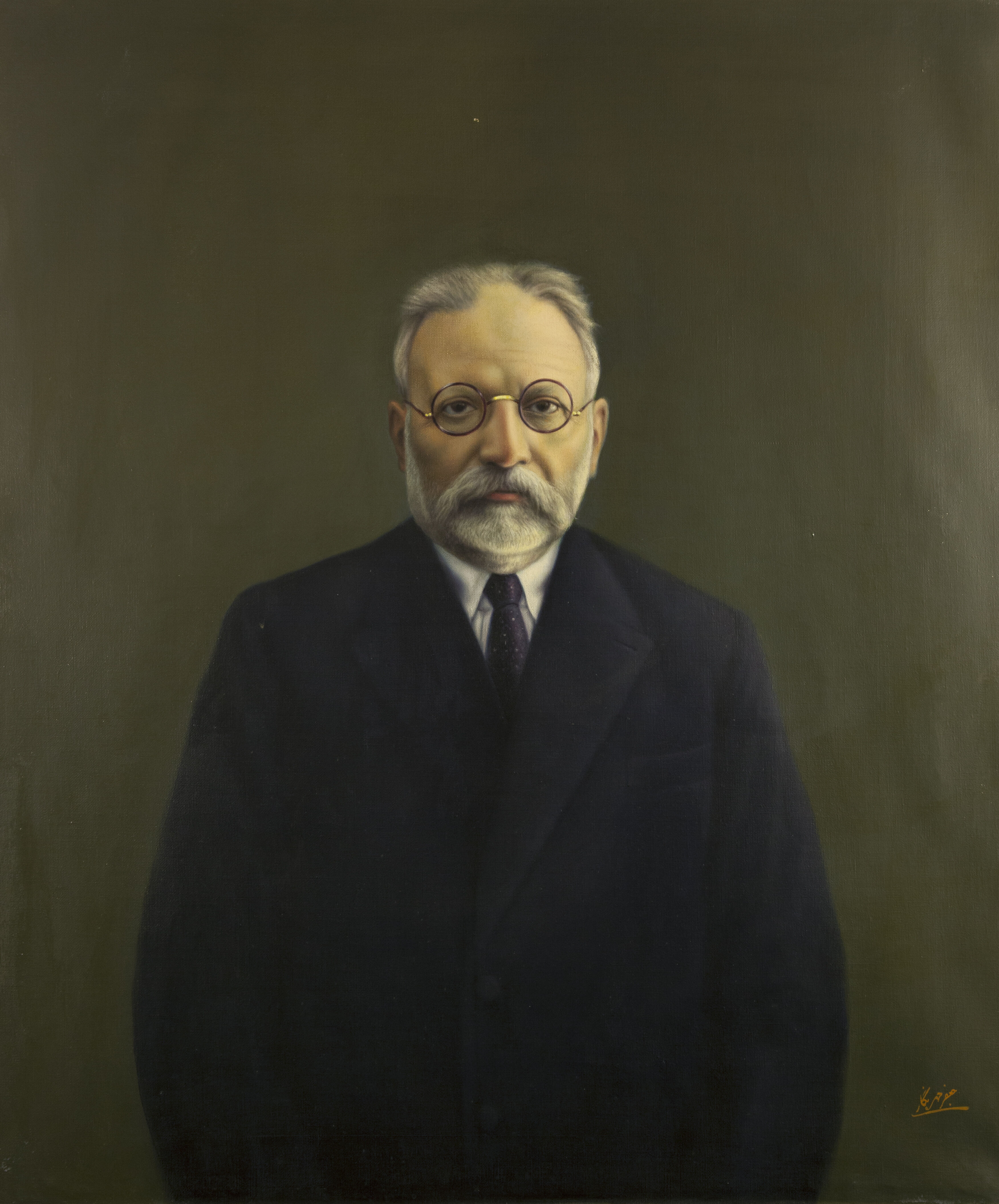
Hassan Esfandiari

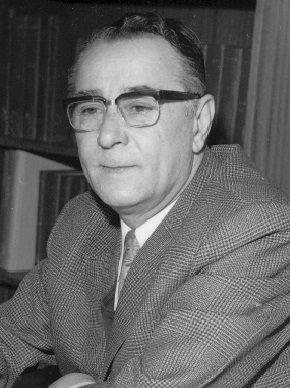
Parviz Natel-Khanlari

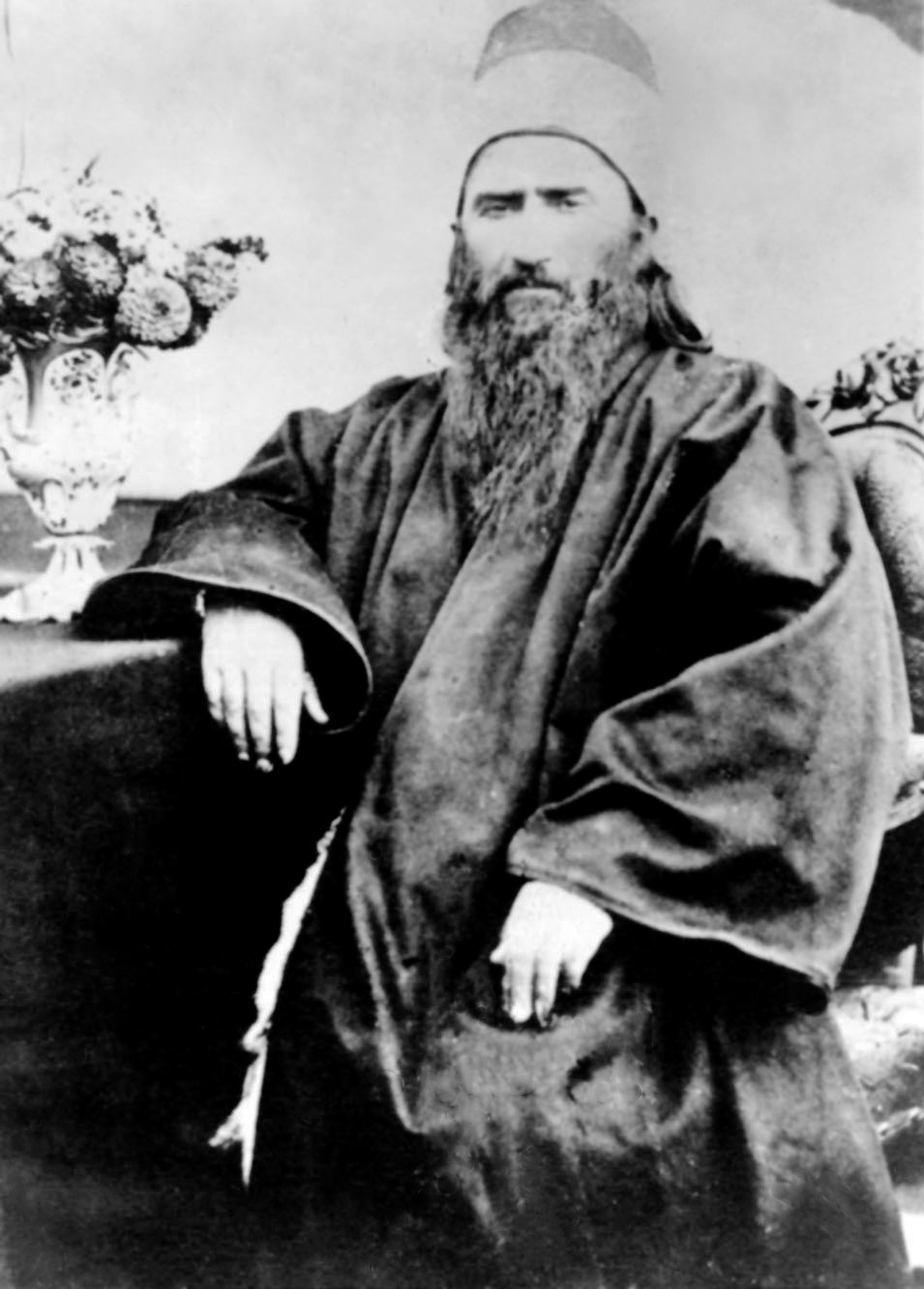
Baháʼu'lláh

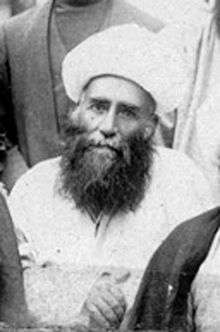
Husain Noori

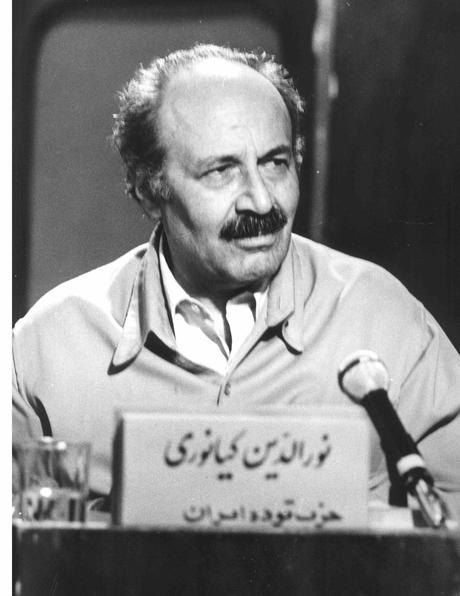
Noureddin Kianouri

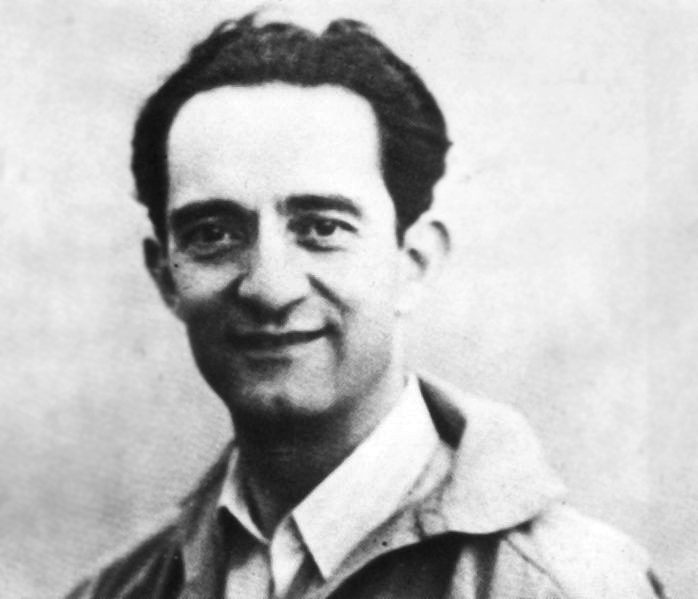
Abolhassan Sadighi

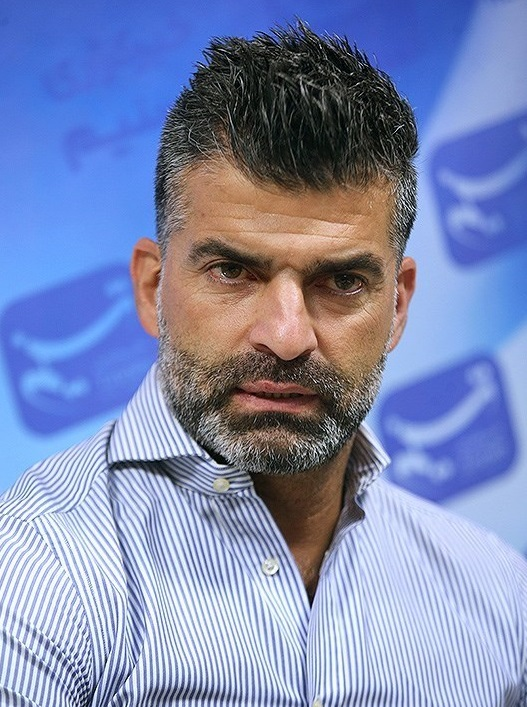
Rahman Rezaei

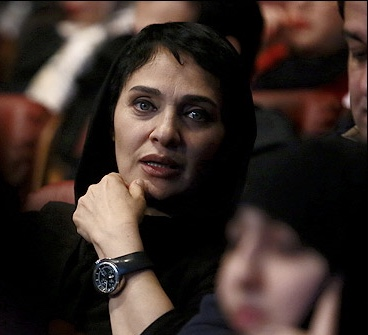
Roya Nonahali

- Mirza Aqa Khan Nuri (1807–1865), politician
- Nima Yooshij (1897–1960), contemporary Persian and Tabarian poet
- Sheikh Fazlollah Noori (1843–1909), Shia Muslim cleric
- 'Mírzá ʻAbbás Núrí and his son, Bahá'u'lláh (1817–1892), Persian religious leader and founder of the Bahá'í Faith
- Gholam-Hossein Banan (1911–1986), Iranian musician and singer
- Haji Washington (1849–1937) Iranian politician, cabinet minister, and diplomat
- Subh-i-Azal (1831–1912), Persian religious leader
- Mirza Husain Noori Tabarsi (1838–1902), Shi'a Islamic cleric and father of Islamic Shi'a Renaissance
- Noureddin Kianouri (1915–1999), politician and revolutionary
- Parviz Natel-Khanlari (1914–1990), Iranian literary scholar, linguist, author, and researcher
- Hossein Shah-Hosseini, politician
- Ali Akbar Nategh-Nouri, politician
- Mirza Hassan Khan Esfandiary (1867–1945), politician
- Gholam Hossein Sadighi, politician
- Mirzá Abbas Núri, father of Baháʼu'lláh, the founder of the Baháʼí Faith
- Abolhassan Sadighi, sculptor and painter
- Sadeq Kia, letters and distinguished professor
- Manouchehr Sotoudeh, geographer and scholar
- Musa Nuri Esfandiari, diplomat and ambassador
- Ahmad Esfandiari, painter and teacher
- Pirouz Mojtahedzadeh, political scientist and historian
- Rahman Rezaei, football player and coach
- Homayoun Behzadi, football player
- Roya Nonahali, actress
- Hamed Kavianpour, football player
- Hanif Omranzadeh, football player
- Nasser Alizadeh, wrestler
