= Mirza Aqa Khan Kermani =

Iranian nationalist journalist and writer

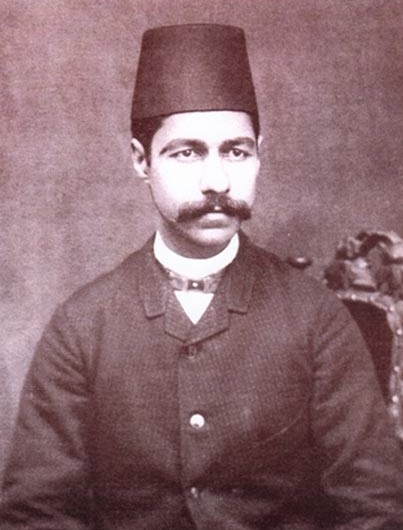
- Born: 1854 Kerman, Qajar Iran
- Died: 1896 (aged 41–42) Tabriz, Qajar Iran
- Occupation: Writer, Journalist
- Spouse: one of Subh-i-Azal's daughters

Mirza Aqa Khan Kermani (Persian: میرزا آقا خان کرمانی; 1854 – 1896/97) was an Iranian intellectual reformer, a Babi, and son-in-law of Subh-i-Azal. In his writings, he advocates for political, social, and religious reform characteristic of his generation of intellectuals whose reformist ideas and engagement with sociopolitical themes set the stage for the Constitutional Revolution of 1906, and the political and literary changes that were to follow.

Kermani was also a literary critic and like many of his contemporaries an advocate of simpler, more accessible prose. He believed that meaning as opposed to the mode of expression exerts real influence on the reader. He thus discouraged the destruction of the natural clarity of language by means of complicated metaphors, difficult words, long sentences, and complex expressions.

== Life ==
Mirza Aqa Khan Kermani was born in 1854 in Kerman into a family with a proper position on the socio-economic ladder. There, he was schooled in mathematics, natural science, and theology (ḥekmat-i ilāhī) and also learned some French and English. He was influenced by Voltaire. At age 32, because of hardship he faced from the governor of Kerman, he moved to Isfahan and then Tehran where he taught Qur'anic interpretation (tafsīr). Eventually, he ended up in Constantinople where many Iranian intellectuals resided. There, he wrote letters to the ulema and statesmen of Iran and elsewhere calling for Islamic unity and attacked Nasir al-Din Shah and his court, including prime minister Mirza Ali Asghar Khan Amin al-Soltan. These attacks motivated the prime minister to seek Kermani’s blood, instructing the Iranian ambassador to Constantinople to convince the Ottomans that Kermani had played a role in the Armenian riots two years earlier. Eventually, the Ottomans turned Kermani over to Iranian authorities and he was executed.

== Three Essays (Se maktūb) ==
Of his most influential texts advocating for reform is Three Essays (Se maktūb). Like many of his contemporaries, Kermani has an idealized image of pre-Islamic Iran. He thus praises pre-Islamic Iran for the geographic vastness of her lands, the virtues and mercy of her kings aided by wise court advisers and Zoroastrian clergy, the order of her fighting men, and the all-encompassing rule of law that governed her lands. This pre-Islamic Iran is then contrasted with the current state of affairs under the Qajar kings. Kermani devotes his energies to the critique of the Shah, though no names are mentioned, and men in court service. Their mismanagement, Kermani tells us compels many talented men to leave Iran for India, Constantinople, and Europe. In addition to political actors, social groupings are also subject to Kermani’s critical pen: merchants are criticized for their immoral trade practices, young men are scorned for their laziness and uselessness, and agents of handicrafts are condemned for their lack of skills. Kermani is distressed over social customs regarding women and marriage. Women’s isolation, he asserts, causes men to pursue sexual acts with children (bache bāzī) while causing depression for women. Moreover, arranged marriages are a problem as they bond two people who have never met—a prescription for disaster and a life replete with discord, Kermani believes.

The utopic pre-Islamic Iran is thus contrasted with the current Iran, which suffers from unjust rulers and a problem-riddled society. This, Kermani claims, is caused by two phenomena: the Arab invasions of the seventh century and the corruption of Islam by ulema, Sufis, and popular superstition. According to Kermani, barbaric Arabs who considered themselves superior imposed unprecedented suffering on Iran and instituted unjust rule, for instance executing men for prostrating before their kings. The ulema corroborated Iran’s destruction at the hand of Arabs by deviating from original Islam of Muhammad—which God had sent to civilize Arab tribes—they introduced plenty of gibberish and minor issues such as rules of ritual purity. Ritual washing before prayer made sense for unhygienic Arabs, Kermani asserts, but should be of little concern to Iran’s princes who bathe frequently. However, the ulema are preoccupied with such minor issues even when the social context makes their application irrelevant and have moved far away from the simple Shariah of original Islam. Muslims themselves are to blame too. They have invented sects and are caught up in superstitions believing in non-nonsensical stories of the ulema. Kermani gives the example of the Safavid-era jurists like Muhammad Baqir Majlisi and Mir damad declaring as ludicrous their detailed accounts of life after death, for example that of believers after death turning into melodious birds while polytheists turn into black crows.

== Selected works ==
- Āyīnah-i sekandarī (Alexandrian Mirror), Nashr-i Chashmah
- Enshāʾallāh, Māshāʾallāh, Sherkat-e Ketab (USA). (This book was translated into German by Mahdi Rezaei Tazik and Michael Mäder in 2017 under the title «Inschallah, Maschallah», and it was published in this volume: «Wissenschaft, Philosophie und Religion – Religionskritische Positionen um 1900», hg. von Anke von Kügelgen, Berlin: Klaus Schwarz Verlag, 2017, pp. 208 – 228).
- Fann-e Goftan wa Neweshtan (The Art of Speaking and Writing), ed. by Mahdi Rezaei Tazik, Nashr-e Asmana (Canada).
- Hasht Bihisht (Eight Heavens)
- Jang-i haftād va du mellat (War of Seventy-Two Nations)
- Nāmah-i bāstān (Book of Ancient Times)
- Nāmah-i sukhanvārān (Book of Eloquent Speakers), also under the title of Āyīn-i sokhanvārī (Rules of eloquence)
- Sad khaţābah (One Hundred Lectures), Shirkat-i Kitāb
- Sih maktūb (Three Essays)
- Rayhān-e būstān-afrūz: bar tarz wa tartīb-e adabiyāt-i farangestān-e emrūz (The Basil that Enlightens the Garden: On the Style and Arrangement of the Literature of Today’s West), ed. by Mahdi Rezaei Tazik, Nashr-e Asmana (Canada).
- Takvīn va tashrīʿ (Creation and Lawmaking), ed. by Mahdi Rezaei Tazik, Nashr-e Asmana (Canada)
- Tārīkh-e Shānzhmān-hā-ye Irān (The History of Changes in Iran), ed. by Mahdi Rezaei Tazik, Nashr-e Asmana (Canada).

== See also ==
- Literary criticism in Iran
- History of Iran
- Intellectual movements in Iran
- Literary criticism in Iran
