= Mírzá ʻAbbás Núrí =

Iranian noble and father of Baháʼu'lláh

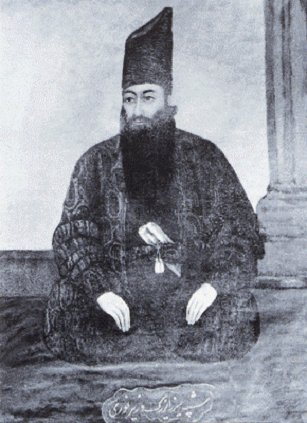
A depiction of Mírzá ʻAbbás Núrí

Mírzá ʻAbbás Núrí (Persian: ميرزا عباس نوری; d. 1839), more commonly known as Mírzá Buzurg, was the father of Baháʼu'lláh, the founder of the Baháʼí Faith. Mírzá Buzurg was a nobleman from the Iranian province of Núr, and worked for a time in the service of Fatḥ-ʻAlí S͟háh Qájár.

Mírzá Buzurg was the son of Mírzá Riḍá-Qulí Big, son of Mírzá ʻAbbás, son of Ḥájí Muḥammad-Riḍá Big, son of Áqá Muhammad-ʻAli, son of Áqá Fak͟hr, son of S͟hahríyár-Ḥasan. He had four wives and three concubines, and at least 15 children.

== Service to the state ==
He served as vizier (Minister) to Imám-Virdi Mírzá, the twelfth son of Fath Ali Shah, who was the Ilkhani' (tribal chief of the clans) of the Qajar tribe. Mírzá Burzurg was later appointed governor of Borujerd and Lorestan.

== Family ==
Mírzá Buzurg's first marriage was arranged by his father, Riḍa-Quli Big, to a relative of the family, named K͟han-Nanih, before Mírzá Buzurg left the district of Núr in Mazandaran to make his fortune in Tehran. Two sons, Mírzá Áqá, the elder, and Mírzá Muḥammad-Ḥasan, were born of this first wife.

Mírzá Buzurg's second wife was K͟hadíjih K͟hánum, who had been married once before and was widowed. She had one son and two daughters by her first marriage, namely, Mírzá Muḥammad-ʻAli, Sakinih K͟hánum and Sug͟hra K͟hánum. Mírzá Buzurg took K͟hadíjih K͟hánum as his wife and wedded her daughter, Sakinih K͟hánum, to his younger brother, Mírzá Muḥammad. The first-born of that marriage was a daughter, Sarih K͟hánum (generally referred to as 'Uk͟ht', Arabic for sister, in Baháʼu'lláh's writings). The next was a son, Mírzá Mihdi, who died in his father's lifetime; and Mírzá Ḥusayn-ʻAlí (Baháʼu'lláh) was the third-born. The fourth was another son, Mírzá Músá, entitled Áqáy-i-Kalím later years, and the fifth was another daughter, Nisá' K͟hánum, who was married eventually to Mírzá Majid-i-Ahi, a secretary of the Russian Legation.

The third wife of Mírzá Buzurg was Kult͟húm K͟hánum-i-Núrí, by whom he had five children. The first was a daughter, S͟háh-Sultán K͟hánum (also called ʻIzziyih K͟hánum), who became a firm supporter of Mírzá Yahyá. Next came three sons: Mírzá Taqi, a poet with the sobriquet Parishan, who became a Shaykhí much opposed to Baháʼu'lláh; Mírzá Riḍa-Quli, who earned the designation 'Ḥájí' by his pilgrimage to Mecca, and who kept apart from Baháʼu'lláh, even trying to conceal the fact of their relationship, although his wife, Maryam, was greatly devoted to him; and the third son, Mírzá Ibráhím, who also died in his father's lifetime. The fifth child of that marriage of Mírzá Buzurg was another daughter, Fatimih-Sulṭán K͟hánum, who also chose to follow Mírzá Yahyá.

The next three wives of Mírzá Buzurg were concubines. The first was Kuc͟hik K͟hánum of Kirmanshah, the mother of Mírzá Yahyá. The second was a Georgian lady, Nabat K͟hánum, and by her Mírzá Buzurg had another daughter, Husniyyih K͟hánum, of whom not much is known. The last concubine, Turkamaniyyih, was the mother of Mírzá Muḥammad-Quli who was greatly devoted to Baháʼu'lláh.

Lastly came Mírzá Buzurg's marriage to a daughter of Fatḥ-ʻAlí S͟háh. This lady, who was entitled Diya'u's-Saltanih was a calligraphy student of Mírzá Buzurg. Their marriage was to bring him nothing but misfortune and, in the end, to prove his undoing.

== Expulsion from service ==
Mírzá Buzurg prospered in the service of the State, until the death of Fath Ali Shah, and the rise of Mohammad Sháh Qájár (r. 1834–48), under whose grand vizier, Haji Mirza Aqasi, he lost his position and much of his considerable wealth.

Haji Mirza Aqasi, the Prime Minister, was antagonistic to Mírzá Buzurg. One reason which prompted his enmity was Mírzá Buzurg's particular friendship with the Qá'im-Maqam, Mirza Abu'l-Qasim of Farahan. In June 1835 the Qá'im-Maqam was put to death by Mohammad Shah. Mírzá Buzurg wrote letters condemnatory of Haji Mirza Aqasi ("May that satyr be kept away from the Shah"), which the Prime Minister eventually encountered, and retaliated with force. He had Mírzá Buzurg dismissed from the governorship of Burujird and Luristan. This post had been given to him by his friend, the Qá'im-Maqam. A document exists in the handwriting of Mohammad Shah himself, commending and praising the services rendered by Mírzá Buzurg in this capacity. Next, Haji Mirza Aqasi stopped Mírzá Buzurg's annual allowance. Then, he began to disturb the relationship between Mírzá Buzurg and his last wife, Ziya us-Saltana, the daughter of Fath Alí Shah. Through her nephew, Firaydun Mirza, he induced Ziya us-Saltanih to seek and obtain divorce from her husband.

Mírzá Buzurg had a large household to support, and could no longer afford to keep up his estates. He was forced to sell a part of his properties and mortgage others, including the complex of houses in Tehran in which he and his family resided. The marriage settlement was of such proportions that the Mírzá Buzurg could not pay it immediately, and Ziya us-Saltanih then had Mirza Buzurg imprisoned in his own house. In the end, Mírzá Buzurg was obliged to sell, once again, his complex of houses in Tehran, and part with the valuable carpets and other furnishings which they contained.

== Later years ==
After the storms subsided, Mírzá Buzurg made an effort to regain the houses which he had had to sell under duress 'for a negligible sum'. A document exists in the handwriting of Baháʼu'lláh, drawn up for the purpose of eliciting from those in the know their testimony to the fact that the sale of the houses had taken place under unlawful pressure. But it did not produce the desired effect and no restitution was made.

Mírzá Buzurg then decided to retire to Iraq, but first died in 1839. His body was taken to Iraq and buried at Najaf, where the tomb of ʻAli is located. He was survived by seven sons and five daughters.

Manuscripts exist in various collections both in and outside of Iran. There is one such scroll in the International Archives of the Baháʼí World Centre.
