= Baháʼí–Azali split =

Schism among the followers of the Báb

The Baháʼí–Azali split occurred when most Bábís accepted Baháʼu'lláh (Ḥusayn-ʻAlí) as the promised one of the Báb's writings, and thus became Baháʼís, leaving a remnant of Bábís who became known as Azalis, the followers of Subh-i-Azal (Mirza Yahya). The split occurred after Baháʼí founder Baháʼu'lláh made his public claim in 1863, leading to expressions of support from the majority of the Bábí community, and opposition from Subh-i-Azal, who became the leader of the remaining group.

== The Báb ==
Siyyid ʻAlí-Muhammad was a merchant from Shiraz, Persia, who at the age of 25, claimed to be a new and independent Manifestation of God, and the promised Qá'im, or Mihdí of Islam. In his early writings he took on the title of the Báb, meaning "Gate", after a Shaykhi concept that explained he was only a, 'door', or 'gate', for a soon to come Manifestation of God, or Prophet. His followers were therefore known as Bábís. He later declared that he was not just 'a Gate to the Mihdi', or the Bab, but he was the Qa'im, or Promised One himself.

The Báb's writings had the concept of the returning messiah called, "He whom God shall make manifest". As the Báb's teachings spread, the Islamic government saw his following as a threat to the state religion. Several military confrontations took place between government and Bábí forces. The Báb was imprisoned and executed by firing squad in Tabriz on July 9, 1850.

== Succession ==
In most of his prominent writings, the Báb alluded to a Promised One, most commonly referred to as "Him whom God shall make manifest", and that he himself was "but a ring upon the hand of Him Whom God shall make manifest." The Bayán is essentially a discourse on Him whom God shall make manifest, and the Báb always discussed his own writings in the context of the coming of Him Whom God shall make manifest. Several of the Báb's writings state the coming of Him Whom God shall make manifest would be imminent.

The Báb eliminated the institution of successorship or vicegerency to his movement, and stated that no other person's writings would be binding after his death until Him Whom God shall make manifest would appear.

He did, however, appoint a nominal leader after himself. Shortly before the Báb's execution, a follower of the Báb, Abd al-Karim, brought to the Báb's attention the necessity to appoint a leader; thus the Báb wrote a certain number of tablets which he gave to Abd al-Karim to deliver to Subh-i-Azal and Baháʼu'lláh. These tablets were later interpreted by both Azalis and Baháʼís as proof of the Báb's delegation of leadership. Baháʼí sources state that the Báb did this at the suggestion of Baháʼu'lláh.

In one of the tablets, which is commonly referred to as the "Will and Testament of the Báb", Subh-i-Azal is viewed to have been appointed as leader of the Bábis after the death of the movement's founder; the tablet, in verse 27, also appears to order Subh-i-Azal "...to obey Him Whom God Shall Make Manifest." Multiple versions of this tablet exist, and Browne notes in his translation that this copy of the letter is actually in Subh-i-Azal's handwriting rather than the Báb's. The Iranologist Edward Granville Browne, discussing a visit with Subh-i-Azal in Cyprus, notes that he saw the original document in the Báb's own handwriting.

In addition to the difficulties of collecting original Bábí documents at such a distance — Browne was at Cambridge — was the widespread Azali practice of Taqiyya (Dissimulation), or concealing one's beliefs. Browne appears to have been unaware of this.

== Leadership and confrontation ==
Subh-i-Azal's leadership was controversial. He generally absented himself from the Bábí community, spending his time in Baghdad in hiding and disguise; he even went so far as to publicly disavow allegiance to the Báb on several occasions. Subh-i-Azal gradually alienated himself from a large proportion of the Bábís who started to give their alliance to other claimants. During the time that both Baháʼu'lláh and Subh-i-Azal were in Baghdad, since Subh-i-Azal remained in hiding, Baháʼu'lláh performed much of the daily administration of the Bábí affairs.

Baháʼu'lláh claimed that in 1852, while a prisoner in Tehran, he was visited by a "Maid of Heaven", which symbolically marked the beginning of his mission as a Messenger of God. In 1863 as he was leaving Baghdad in the Garden of Ridván, he made his first public declaration to be Him Whom God Shall Make Manifest, the messianic figure in the Báb's writings, to a small number of followers. This declaration started a new phase of leadership in the Bábí community that would eventually lead to the emergence of the Baháʼí Faith as a separate movement distinct from Bábism. While in Adrianople (current-day Edirne, Turkey), Baháʼu'lláh was the clear leader of the newly established Bábí community, and a permanent break between Baháʼu'lláh and Subh-i-Azal occurred.

In 1865 Subh-i-Azal was accused of attempting to plot to kill Baháʼu'lláh. In contemporary accounts, Subh-i-Azal is reported to have tried to have Baháʼu'lláh assassinated at the hands of the barber of the local bath. The barber, Muhammad ʻAlí of Isfahán, apparently refused and spread word of the danger around the community. Baháʼu'lláh is reported to have counselled "on all patience, quietude and gentleness". This pattern was repeated when, according to the personal account of Ustád Muhammad-ʻAlíy-i Salmání, Subh-i Azal attempted to persuade him likewise to murder Baháʼu'lláh in the bath. Eventually Subh-i-Azal attempted to poison Baháʼu'lláh that left him gravely ill for a time, and left him with a shaking hand for the rest of his life. Later, followers of Azal made the counter-claim that Baháʼu'lláh had accidentally poisoned himself while trying to poison others. Smith also notes that the Baháʼí accounts of this dispute seem to be credible.

After this event in 1866 Baháʼu'lláh made his claim to be Him Whom God Shall Make Manifest public, as well as making a formal written announcement to Subh-i-Azal referring to his followers for the first time as the "people of Bahá". After his public announcement, Baháʼu'lláh secluded himself in his house and instructed the Bábís to choose between himself and Subh-i-Azal. Baháʼu'lláh's claims threatened Subh-i-Azal's position as leader of the religion since it would mean little to be leader of the Bábís if "Him Whom God Shall Make Manifest" were to appear and start a new religion. Subh-i-Azal responded by making his own claims, but his attempt to preserve the traditional Bábísm was largely unpopular, and his followers became the minority.

In 1867, Subh-i-Azal challenged Baháʼu'lláh to a test of the divine will in a local mosque in Edirne (Adrianople), such that "God would strike down the impostor." Baháʼu'lláh agreed, and went to the Sultan Selim mosque at the appointed time, but Mirza Yahya lost face and lost credibility when he refused to show up.

Eventually Baháʼu'lláh was recognized by the vast majority of Bábís as "He whom God shall make manifest" and his followers began calling themselves Baháʼís. The small minority of Bábís that followed Subh-i-Azal became known as Azalis.

== Exile of community ==
After the Bábí community was separated into two, the Azalis tried to discredit Baháʼu'lláh to the Ottoman authorities, accusing him of causing agitation against the government. While an investigation cleared Baháʼu'lláh, it did notify the government that Baháʼu'lláh and Subh-i-Azal were propagating religious claims, and may cause future disorder, and thus led to the further exile of the 'Bábí' leaders. A royal command was issued in July 1868 condemning the Bábís to perpetual imprisonment and isolation in far-flung outposts of the Ottoman Empire — Famagusta, Cyprus for Subh-i-Azal and his followers, and ʻAkká, in Ottoman Palestine, for Baháʼu'lláh and his followers.

While most of those that followed Subh-i-Azal were sent to Cyprus, some were sent to Akká, intended to serve as spies. In 1872 a few Baháʼís decided to kill the followers of Subh-i-Azal as they were causing endless difficulties to the Baháʼí community. Baháʼu'lláh strongly condemned the action, and publicly condemned the murderers as clear violators of Baháʼí law. The Ottoman authorities initially hardened the imprisonment of Baháʼu'lláh. But as Baháʼu'lláh was later exonerated by the authorities as having no connection to the murders, their imprisonment was eased.

== After the split ==
Eventually Baháʼu'lláh was recognized by the vast majority of Bábís as "He whom God shall make manifest" and his followers began calling themselves Baháʼís. By 1908 there were probably from half a million to a million Baháʼís, and at most only a hundred followers of Subh-i-Azal. Subh-i Azal died in Famagusta, Cyprus in 1912, and his followers are known as Azalis or Azali Bábis. MacEoin notes that after the deaths of those Azali Babis who were active in the Constitutional Revolution in Iran, the Azali form of Babism entered a stagnation from which it has not recovered as there is no longer any acknowledged leader or central organization. In the 2000s, estimates of the number of Azalis were no more than a few thousand. The World Religion Database estimated 7.3 million Baháʼís in 2010 and stated: "The Baha'i Faith is the only religion to have grown faster in every United Nations region over the past 100 years than the general population; Baha'i(sic) was thus the fastest-growing religion between 1910 and 2010, growing at least twice as fast as the population of almost every UN region." Baháʼí sources since 1991 usually estimate the worldwide Baháʼí population at "above 5 million".

After Baháʼu'lláh's death, leadership of the religion then passed on to ʻAbdu'l-Bahá, Baháʼu'lláh's son, who was appointed by Baháʼu'lláh, and was accepted by almost all Baháʼís. After the death of ʻAbdu'l-Bahá in 1921, the leadership of the Baháʼí community was passed on to his grandson, Shoghi Effendi, who was appointed in ʻAbdu'l-Bahá's will. The document appointed Shoghi Effendi as the first Guardian, and called for the election of the Universal House of Justice once the Baháʼí Faith had spread sufficiently for such elections to be meaningful. Shoghi Effendi died in 1957, and in 1963 the Universal House of Justice was elected. Since 1963 the Universal House of Justice has been elected every five years and remains the successor and leading institution of the religion.

There are conflicting reports as to whom Subh-i-Azal appointed as his successor. Browne reports that there was confusion over who was to be Subh-i-Azal's successor at his death. Subh-i-Azal's son, Rizwán ʻAli, reported that he had appointed the son of Aqa Mirza Muhammad Hadi Daulatabadi as his successor; while another, H.C. Lukach's, states that Mirza Yahya had said that whichever of his sons "resembled him the most" would be the successor. None appear to have stepped forward. MacEoin notes that Subh-i-Azal appointed his son, Yahya Dawlatabadi, as his successor, but he notes that there is little evidence that Yahya Dawlatabadi was involved in the affairs of the religion, and that instead he spent his time as that of secular reformer. Shoghi Effendi reports that Mirza Yahya appointed a distinguished Bábí, Aqa Mirza Muhammad Hadi of Daulatabad (Mirza Hadiy-i-Dawlat-Abadi) successor, but he later publicly recanted his faith in the Báb and in Mirza Yahya. Mirza Yahya's eldest son apparently became a Baháʼí himself.

== Azali Taqiyya (Dissimulation) ==
The practice of Taqiyya (Dissimulation, or concealing one's beliefs) was widespread among the Bábís. While the primary means of transmitting copies of documents was manually copying them which could introduce discrepancies between copies the practice of taqiyya led some to actually alter and falsify Bábí teachings and history. This compromised their campaign against Baháʼu'lláh. One Baháʼí historian has concluded:

"Bahaullah clearly announced that the recognition of the manifestation of God and 'steadfastness' [in] His Cause is more important than observing any of the other teachings. Gradual abandonment of taqiyyah amongst the Bahaʼis was one of the distinguishing feature[s] of the new religion from the Babi era. After this time the practice of taqiyyah became unofficially superseded after the execution of the Bab. [...] In contrast the Azali Babis glorified taqiyyah in their literature. taqiyyah [sic] was considered a virtue and classified into various levels of concealment. Prominent Azali leaders openly recanted their faith and even abused Bab and Azal in the process. The extent of taqiyyah in their words and actions caused Mirza Abu'l-Faḍl to question Edward Browne's method of portraying of Azali Babis. Taqiyyah became one of the distinguishing features of the Azali-Bahai split."

— Manuchehri, The Practice of Taqiyyah (Dissimulation) in the Babi and Bahai Religions, 1999

Compounding the problem of collecting reliable manuscripts, Azali taqiyya rendered many early Bábí documents unreliable afterwards, as Azali Bábís would often alter and falsify Bábí teachings and history.

== Doctrinal disputes ==
=== The completion of the Bayán ===
The Arabic Bayán is a book written by the Báb around 1848, and is the smaller sister book to the Persian Bayán. The work is incomplete, containing only eleven chapters of a supposedly total nineteen. In the tablet that is considered the Báb's will and testament, he gives permission to Subh-i-Azal to finish the remaining eight, with the permission of Him Whom God Shall Make Manifest. The Azalis believe that this means that the Báb authorized Subh-i-Azal to finish the text of the Arabic Bayán. However, Saiedi states that even if it is assumed that Subh-i-Azal was allowed to finish the remaining chapters of the book, it could only happen if He whom God shall make manifest had already appeared and had revealed the eight chapters for him. The Báb states that after his death no one else's writings will be binding until the appearance of He whom God shall make manifest, and the text of the Arabic Bayán was written in a style termed "divine verses", and the Báb states that in another one of his writings that after him only He whom God shall make manifest can reveal divine verses. Subh-i-Azal did write a book that was supposed to complete the Bayán, the Mutammim-i-Bayan, but instead of completing the Arabic Bayán, he tries to extend the Persian Bayán; it seems Subh-i-Azal, unlike his followers, did not understand the reference of the Báb to mean that he had to complete the Arabic Bayán.

Saiedi also points to another translation and interpretation of the version in the Báb's letter: the Báb's use the word manahij (paths) in two ways; in one way it refers to the chapters of the Bayán, and in another way it refers to the entire Bayán and his laws. Saiedi states that the reference to manifesting the eight paths may refer to the distribution of the eight copies of the Bayán that the Báb had sent to Subh-i-Azal, to the eight individuals who are identified in the letter, when the Promised One appears.

=== Year of revelation ===
The Báb prophesied that the messianic figure He whom God shall make manifest would emerge some time in the future. Many of the Báb's writings support the belief that He whom God shall make manifest's arrival would be imminent. The Baháʼí belief is that the Báb's writings allude to the year 9, while the Azali belief is that He whom God shall make manifest would come after 2000 years.

In Azali belief, the Promised One could not appear until the realization of the laws of the Bayán and the maturation of the Bayán in 2000 years. However, there are problems with this belief and inconsistencies in Azali belief. The Azalis believe that the Báb gave permission for Subh-i-Azal to complete the Arabic Bayán with the permission of He whom God shall make manifest, thus pointing to He whom God shall make manifest appearing in Subh-i-Azal's own lifetime. Also, the Nuqtatu'l-Kaf, an Azali text, states that the laws of the Bayán may be abrogated a few years after the Báb's death, and that He whom God shall make manifest may appear within Subh-i-Azal's lifetime. The Azali view that the appearance of He whom God shall make manifest can only occur thousands of years in the future is also problematic, since in some of their texts they state that Subh-i-Azal is He whom God shall make manifest.

The Báb writes in many of his texts about the imminent appearance of the Promised One. In many of his writings he refers to the year nine and nineteen from the beginning of his claimed revelation (1844) as to the appearance of He whom God shall make manifest. He also uses the Abjad numerals of Arabic, a system of providing numerical values for letters and words, to identify the coming of He whom God shall make manifest, referring the manifest aspect of the Most Great Name of God as "Vahid" which has a numerical value of 19 and the hidden aspect of the same name as "Bahá" which has a numerical value of 9. Baháʼís point to the Báb's allusions to the years nine (1853) and nineteen (1863) in the Báb's writings as a prophecy of Baháʼu'lláh being He whom God shall make manifest. Baháʼu'lláh claimed that while being imprisoned in the Siyah-Chal in 1853 in Iran he underwent a series of mystical experiences including having a vision of the Maid of Heaven who told him of his divine mission, and the promise of divine assistance. In 1863 as he was leaving Baghdad in the Garden of Ridván, Baháʼu'lláh made his first public declaration to be Him Whom God Shall Make Manifest.

== Baháʼí views of the split ==
Baháʼís argue that succession in the Bábí religion was superseded when the Baháʼí Faith's founder Baháʼu'lláh declared himself to be He whom God shall make manifest – they often describe Subh-i-Azal as an "interim head."

Baháʼís view Subh-i-Azal's leadership largely as a nominal head. According to Taherzadeh:

"Mirza Yahya [Subh-i-Azal] came into prominence not because he possessed any outstanding qualities, but rather through his close link with Baháʼu'lláh. In order to divert the attention of the enemies of the Faith from the person of Baháʼu'lláh, Who had emerged as a focal point among the early believers, the Báb wholeheartedly approved the suggestion of nominating the youthful and relatively unknown Mirza Yahya [Subh-i-Azal] as the chief of the Bábí community. This suggestion had come from Baháʼu'lláh, and only two others were aware of the plan, namely, Baháʼu'lláh's faithful brother Mírzá Músá (Áqáy-i-Kalím) and a certain Mulla Abdu'l-Karim-i-Qazvini, who had been entrusted by the Báb, shortly before His martyrdom, with the task of delivering His pen-case, seals and writings to Baháʼu'lláh; he was subsequently martyred in Tihran at the time of Baháʼu'lláh's imprisonment in the Siyah-Chal. The advantages of this nomination were obvious and, as this system operated for some time, those who were endowed with insight and wisdom were able to see that Mirza Yahya was only a figurehead, and that it was the guiding hand of Baháʼu'lláh alone that was unobtrusively directing the affairs of the Bábí community after the martyrdom of the Báb."

This view is supported by the Báb's long-time secretary Mulla Abdu'l-Karim-i-Qazvini, believed to be the only other person who participated in the plan. John Walbridge writes:

"With him [Mulla Abdu'l-Karim-i-Qazvini] Baháʼu'lláh originated the plan to proclaim Mirza Yahya as the Báb's successor while keeping him in hiding — this in order to deflect attention from Baháʼu'lláh, who was well known to the authorities and the people."

Qazvini himself wrote in a letter in 1851 describing the urgency that the friends do nothing to call attention to Baháʼu'lláh during his period of messianic secrecy:

"But it is requested, according to his [Baháʼu'lláh] command, that the friends should desist from hinting around (shivih-ha) about him, as they had in the past, in such a way that they provoked troubles for the friends of God; and that they should avoid bringing sorrow upon that gentleman, who is of gentle disposition.

...

Let them not provoke investigations or cause the encounter with God to become more distant, or become a veil of chains and manacles between the servants and the Lord of Lords any more than they already have been."

Near the end of his life the Báb had his remaining writings, other accoutrement, as well as a particular tablet addressed to Baháʼu'lláh, delivered to him.

"In Qum, shortly before the Báb's martyrdom, he received a coffer from the Báb containing the last of his writings and his pen-case, seals, rings, and the famous pentacle tablet containing 350 derivatives of the word Bahá. He left the same day for Tehran, explaining that the Báb's accompanying letter ordered him to deliver it to Baháʼu'lláh."

Baháʼís believes there is symbolism in the Báb sending to Báhá'u'llah not only all of his remaining writings, but his seals and his pens, literally handing over the instruments of revelation, along with the pentacle tablet written in his own hand confirming Baháʼu'lláh's station. In a letter addressed to Azal, commonly referred to as the Báb's 'Will & Testament', the Báb commands Azal to obey the Him Whom God shall make manifest, making it clear that he was not be the One promised by the Báb:

"We order you to obey Him Whom God Shall Make Manifest. He will verily appear amongst this people with a sublime reign in the final resurrection. Verily we are all servants and kneel down before Him. He shall carry out whatever He wishes, with permission from His Lord. He shall not be questioned for his actions. However, all others are responsible for everything they do." [verses 27–29]

Regarding Subh-i-Azal, common Baháʼí belief is summarised by Shoghi Effendi, who wrote that Subh-i-Azal was "good-natured yet susceptible to the slightest influence". This is a reference to Siyyid Muhammad-i-Isfahani, who is accused of conspiring with Subh-i-Azal and leading him astray. He is sometimes described as the Baháʼí "anti-Christ".

== Azali view of the split ==
Azalis rejected the divine claims of Baháʼu'lláh as premature, arguing that the world must first accept the laws of the Báb before He Whom God Shall Make Manifest can appear.
