= Subh-i-Azal =

Iranian religious leader (1831–1912)

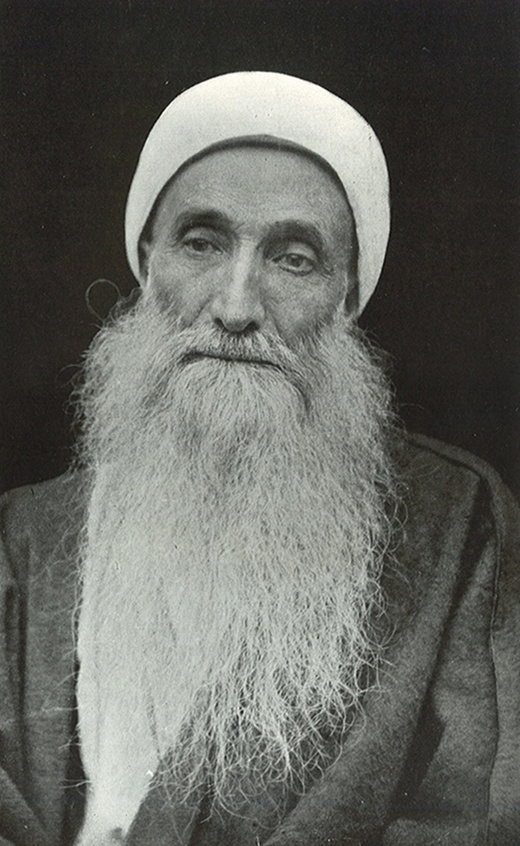
- Subh-i-Azal at the age of 80, Famagusta, circa 1911

Personal life
- Born: Mīrzā Yahyā Nūrī; 1831 Tehran or Nur, Mazandaran (sources differ)
- Died: April 29, 1912 (aged 80–81) Famagusta, British Cyprus
- Children: Nine sons and five daughters
- Parent(s): Mirza Abbas Nuri; Kuchak Khanum
- Notable work(s): Kitab-i-Nur, Ahkam-i-Bayan, Dhil-i-Bayan-i-Farsi
- Known for: Azalí Bábí leadership
- Relatives: Baháʼu'lláh (half-brother); Sheikh Ahmad Rouhi (son-in-law); Mirza Aqa Khan Kermani (son-in-law)

Religious life
- Religion: Bábism

Senior posting
- Predecessor: Báb (as Primal Point)
- Successor: Witnesses of the Bayān; Yahyā Dawlatābādī (per Browne)

Subh-i-Azal (Note: Persian: صبح ازل, romanized: Ṣobḥ-e Azal) (1831–1912), born Mīrzā Yaḥyā Nūrī (Note: Persian: میرزا یحیی, romanized: Mirzā Yaḥyā), was an Iranian Bábí religious figure and writer who was designated by the Báb shortly before the Báb's execution in 1850 as a leading figure in the Bábí community. The nature of this appointment—whether it constituted a full succession, a nominal or protective designation pending the appearance of He whom God shall make manifest, or part of the Báb's broader rejection of formal successorship—has been disputed among scholars.

After the execution of the Báb, Subh-i-Azal was regarded by some Bábís as a point of reference, but his practical leadership was limited by his policy of concealment, the fragmented condition of the Bábí community after the persecutions of 1852–53, and the fact that not all Bábís accepted his authority; some even advanced claims of their own, including claims to the messianic station. During the Baghdad period, many Bábís increasingly turned to his half-brother Baháʼu'lláh for guidance, and Baháʼu'lláh emerged as the community's most visible and influential figure. After the later conflict between the two half-brothers, those Bábís who continued to recognize Subh-i-Azal's authority became known as Azalís.

At the time of appointment in 1850, he was just 19 years old. Two years later, a pogrom began to exterminate the Bábís in Iran, and Subh-i-Azal fled for Baghdad for 10 years before joining the group of Bábí exiles that were called to Istanbul. During the time in Baghdad tensions grew with Baháʼu'lláh, as Bábís began to turn to the latter for leadership. The Ottoman government further exiled the group to Edirne, where Subh-i-Azal openly rejected Baháʼu'lláh's messianic claim and a formal schism developed between Baháʼu'lláh's followers and the smaller group that followed Subh-i-Azal.

In 1868 the Ottoman government further exiled Subh-i-Azal and his followers to Cyprus, and Baháʼu'lláh and his followers to Acre in Palestine. When Cyprus was leased to Britain in 1878, he lived out the rest of his life in obscurity on a British pension.

By 1904, Azal's followers had dwindled to a small minority, and Baháʼu'lláh was almost universally recognized as the spiritual successor of the Báb. After Azal's death in 1912, the Azalí form of Bábism entered a stagnation and has not recovered as there is no acknowledged leader or central organization. Most Bábís either accepted the claim of Baháʼu'lláh or the community gradually diminished as children and grandchildren turned back to Islam. A source in 2001 estimated no more than a few thousand, almost entirely in Iran. Another source in 2009 noted a very small number of followers remained in Uzbekistan.

== Name and title ==
His given name was Yahyā, which is the Arabic form of the English name "John". As the son of a nobleman in the county of Núr, he was known as Mīrzā Yahyā Nūrī (Persian: میرزا یحیی نوری). His most widely known title, "Subh-i-Azal" (or "Sobh-i-Ezel"; Persian: صبح ازل, "Morning of Eternity") is derived from an Islamic tradition called the Hadith-i-Kumayl, a tradition the Báb quotes in his book Dalā'il-i-Sab'ih.

It was common practice for the Báb to confer titles or new names for his followers. Mīrzā Yahyā Nūrī was granted such titles as al-Waḥīd, Ṭalʻat an-Nūr, and ath-Thamara, Everlasting Mirror (Mir'ātu'l-Azalíyya), Name of Eternity (Ismu'l-azal), and Fruit of the Bayan (Thamara-i-Bayan). The title of Subh-i-Azal appears in the 1853 work of Baháʼu'lláh titled Tablet of All Food.

== Background ==
Subh-i-Azal was born in 1831 to Mīrzā Buzurg-i-Nūrī and his fourth wife Kuchak Khanum-i-Karmanshahi. Sources differ on his birthplace, variously giving Tehran or the family's ancestral district of Nur in Mazandaran. His father was a minister in the court of Fath-Ali Shah Qajar. His mother died while giving birth to him, and his father died in 1839 when he was eight years old, after which he was cared for by his stepmother Khadíjih Khánum, the mother of Baháʼu'lláh.

In 1845, at about the age of 14, Subh-i-Azal became a follower of the Báb after the adoption of the faith by his elder brother.

=== Early activities in the Bábí community ===
Subh-i-Azal met Tahirih, the 17th Letter of the Living who had, upon leaving the Conference of Badasht, traveled to Nur to propagate the faith. Shortly thereafter, she arrived at Barfurush and met Subh-i-Azal and became acquainted once again with Quddús who instructed her to take Subh-i-Azal with her to Nur. Subh-i-Azal remained in Nur for three days, during which he propagated the new faith.

During the Battle of Fort Tabarsi, Subh-i-Azal, along with Baháʼu'lláh and Mirza Zayn al-Abedin endeavoured to travel there to assist the Bábís. However, they were arrested several kilometers from Amul. Their imprisonment was ordered by the governor, but Subh-i-Azal escaped the officials for a short while, after which he was discovered by a villager and then brought to Amul on foot with his hands tied. On the path to Amul he was subject to harassment, and people are reported to have spat at him. Upon arriving he was reunited with the other prisoners. The prisoners were ordered to be beaten, but when it came time that Subh-i-Azal should suffer the punishment, Baha'u'llah objected and offered to take the beating in his place. After some time, the governor wrote to Abbas Quli Khan who was commander of the government forces stationed near Fort Tabarsi. Khan replied back to the governor's correspondence, saying that the prisoners were of distinguished families and should not be harassed. Thus, the prisoners were released and sent to Nur upon orders of the commander.

=== Marriages and children ===
According to Browne, Mirza Yahya had several wives, and at least nine sons and five daughters. His sons included: Nurullah, Hadi, Ahmad, Abdul Ali, Rizwan Ali (known as Constantine the Persian), and four others. Rizwan Ali reports that he had eleven or twelve wives. Later research reports that he had up to seventeen wives including four in Iran and at least five in Baghdad. Smith reports that he had "perhaps twenty-five children in all".

His granddaughter, Roshanak Nodust, was later known for starting Peyk-e Saadat Nesvan, the first woman's rights magazine in Iran.

== Appointment ==
Subh-i-Azal first came to the attention of the Báb after the Báb received letters from him, and the two began corresponding. The Nuqtatu'l-Kaf dates this event to the "fifth year of the manifestation [e.g. of the Báb]" (1849). Denis MacEoin notes that Sayyid Ḥusayn Yazdī, the Báb's amanuensis and one of the Letters of the Living, reported that the Báb responded favorably to Subh-i-Azal's writings. In correspondence with Mullā ʿAbd al-Karīm Qazvīnī, Subh-i-Azal's amanuensis, Sayyid Ḥusayn indicated that the Báb welcomed further writings from Azal. MacEoin also states that in the Báb's late work Kitáb-i-Panj Sha'n (Book of Five Modes), Subh-i-Azal is associated with the return of Imām Ḥusayn and described symbolically as a fruit that had matured in the year six, understood as 1850. Nader Saiedi, by contrast, identifies the "Son of ʻAlí" (Husayn) figure mentioned in the Kitáb-i Panj Shaʼn with Baháʼu'lláh—whose given name, Ḥusayn-ʻAlí, has the same numerical value (238) as the "Brother of the Fruit" to whom the Báb addressed the relevant tablets—rather than with Subh-i-Azal.

Shortly before his execution, the Báb entrusted letters to Mullā ʿAbd al-Karīm for delivery to Subh-i-Azal and Baháʼu'lláh. Both Azalís and Baháʼís later interpreted these letters as evidence that the Báb had delegated leadership to the two brothers. In the letter addressed to Subh-i-Azal, the Báb instructed him to safeguard himself, preserve the writings of the Bayán and subsequent revelations, and recite verses inspired in his heart. Baháʼu'lláh was instructed to protect Subh-i-Azal and the writings entrusted to him.

The appointment occurred in a context of intense danger for the leading Bábís. Baháʼu'lláh, who had become a prominent supporter of the Báb and was socially prominent in Iran, had already been exposed to official hostility and a death warrant had been issued against him by Mohammad Shah shortly before the king's death. Scholars have noted that placing Baháʼu'lláh openly at the head of the Bábí community would have increased the risk of his execution, particularly under the premiership of Amir Kabir, who sought to suppress the leading Bábís. At the time, Subh-i-Azal was still a teenager and had not played a public leadership role in the Bábí movement. For this reason, a number of scholars, including Baháʼí authors, have interpreted the designation as a limited or nominal appointment: according to this view, Baháʼu'lláh, Subh-i-Azal, and one of the Báb's secretaries reached an arrangement by which the younger brother would be recognized as a figurehead of the Bábí community and kept out of public view for his safety. This would leave Bahá'u'lláh freer to continue his activities as a leading Bábí. Accordingly, the Báb sent a letter to Mírzá Yahyá naming him to nominal leadership pending the imminent appearance of the Promised One, commonly referred to as 'Him Whom God shall make manifest' by the Báb. Denis MacEoin, while noting this as a common Baháʼí explanation, has raised objections to its implications.

The interpretation of Subh-i-Azal's appointment is closely related to the central place of He whom God shall make manifest in the Báb's writings. The Báb repeatedly presented his own revelation, laws, and writings as preparatory to the advent of this promised figure, whom he described as greater than himself. The Persian Bayán, the central legal and doctrinal text of Bábism, has been described by scholars as oriented less toward establishing a final religious order than toward preparing believers for the recognition of this promised figure; references to him appear throughout the work. The Báb also instructed his followers to recognize the promised figure through independent investigation, warning them not to make even the Báb's own writings, his own authority, or the authority of leading Bábís such as the Letters of the Living, a barrier to recognizing him.

On this reading, Subh-i-Azal's appointment did not create a continuing interpretive authority comparable to a permanent successor in earlier religious traditions. Rather, it has been understood by Baháʼí writers and some scholars as a limited or nominal arrangement for preserving the Bábí community and the Báb's writings until the appearance of He whom God shall make manifest. This interpretation is reinforced by the fact that the Báb assigned Subh-i-Azal the task of collecting and preserving his writings so that they could be presented to the promised figure, rather than used as a standard by which to judge or reject him. In this view, the centrality of He whom God shall make manifest in Bábí doctrine limits the significance of Subh-i-Azal's appointment and helps explain why Baháʼís regard it as provisional and administrative rather than as a permanent claim to supreme religious authority.

In the period immediately following the Báb's execution in 1850, multiple claims to authority emerged, and Bábís did not initially unite around Subh-i-Azal's leadership. At some point, Azal became the recognized leader; though his leadership seems to have had little effect. Sayyid Ḥusayn Yazdī actively promoted the succession of Subh-i-Azal after the death of the Báb. In a letter to ʿAbd al-Karīm Qazvīnī, he alludes to the appearance of Azal as "the appearance of your lord in the ripe fruit", and in another letter, he instructs Ḥājj Ṣulaymān Khān Tabrīzī that "whenever verses are revealed from the heaven of azaliyyat, enclose them with your own letters."

=== Interpretations of the appointment ===
The nature of Subh-i-Azali's role has been the subject of debate due to conflicting sources. Warburg states that, "It seems likely that Subh-i-Azal was designated to be the Bab's successor", and MacEoin states that, the Báb regarded him as "his chief deputy" and the "future head of the movement".

One of the Bab's tablets, often called the Báb's "Will and Testament", instructs Subh-i-Azal to obey "Him Whom God shall make manifest" when he appears (verses 27–29). Baháʼí writers cite this as evidence that the Báb did not intend Subh-i-Azal to be the promised one or a permanent successor, while Azalís read the appointment as standing until the promised one's distant advent. Baháʼí sources and several scholars argue that Subh-i-Azal's headship was largely nominal. According to an account, translated by Juan Cole, the Báb's secretary Mullá ʻAbd al-Karím-i-Qazvíní helped originate a plan to proclaim the young, little-known Subh-i-Azal as head while keeping him hidden, in order to divert official attention from Baháʼuʼlláh.

The nature of Subh-i-Azal's appointment remains disputed. One interpretation treats him as the Báb's designated successor, chief deputy, or future head of the Bábí community; another, advanced in Baháʼí accounts, regards the appointment as a limited or protective arrangement intended to shield Baháʼu'lláh from official attention. The conflicting claims and counter-claims of Azalí and Baháʼí sources make the early history of the split difficult to reconstruct with certainty. A number of scholars describe Subh-i-Azal's leadership as limited, nominal, or ineffective, citing his youth, concealment, the presence of other Bábí claimants, and the practical leadership exercised by Baháʼu'lláh. Other writers give greater weight to evidence that the Báb intended Subh-i-Azal to occupy a more substantial position, while still acknowledging that the meaning and effectiveness of the appointment became the subject of later dispute.

The scholar Armin Eschraghi has argued that the view of the Azalís as guardians of original Babism who were outmaneuvered by the Baháʼís derives largely from E. G. Browne and "does not hold up in the light of sources", and that it persists mainly because Azalí literature has received little critical study.

=== Subh-i-Azal in contemporary sources of early Bábí history ===
Edward Granville Browne studied the Bábí movement in Iran and translated a number of primary sources between 1890 and 1920. Among the works that drew his attention was Kitāb-i-Nuqṭatu'l-Kāf (Persian: كتاب نقطة الكاف, Book of the Point of the Letter Kāf), an early Bábí history that appeared to support the authority of Subh-i-Azal. Browne acquired a manuscript of the work in 1892 from a collection originally owned by Arthur de Gobineau and later sold to the Bibliothèque Nationale in Paris. Because no other copy was then known to him, Browne regarded the manuscript as highly important. Its publication was encouraged by Muḥammad Qazvīnī, a Shi'ite scholar. Browne asked Subh-i-Azal about the authorship of the text, and Azal attributed it to Hājī Mīrzā Jānī, a Bábí who had died in 1852.

Browne compared Nuqṭatu'l-Kāf with Tārīkh-i-Jadīd, a later Bábí history written by Mīrzā Ḥusayn Hamadānī and based in part on the work of Hājī Mīrzā Jānī. Although the two works contained overlapping material, Tārīkh-i-Jadīd omitted passages in Nuqṭatu'l-Kāf that supported Subh-i-Azal's authority. Browne therefore concluded that Baháʼís had altered or suppressed earlier Bábí history in order to weaken Azal's claims and strengthen the position of Baháʼu'lláh.

Baháʼí writers rejected Browne's conclusion, arguing that Nuqṭatu'l-Kāf was not identical with Hājī Mīrzā Jānī's original chronicle and that Azalí circles had promoted a distorted or redacted version of the text. Later scholarship has supported several objections to Browne's interpretation. It has shown that Nuqṭatu'l-Kāf was present in multiple Baháʼí collections, including in Iran and Haifa, and therefore was not simply suppressed. It has also argued that the text contains material and attitudes that appear to postdate the death of its supposed author, indicating that it was later revised or redacted in favor of an Azalí point of view. The work should therefore not be treated simply as the original history of early Bábism that Tārīkh-i-Jadīd replaced, but as an alternative tradition that preserves some early material while also reflecting later Azalí shaping.

Denis MacEoin examined the issue in detail in The Sources for Early Babi Doctrine and History (1992), and Juan Cole later argued that Browne's edition preserved redactions made during the Baháʼí–Azalí split. On this view, Nuqṭatu'l-Kāf is important because it contains early Bábí material, but it cannot be read as a neutral or untouched record of the movement before the split.

Subsequent manuscript discoveries added another layer to the discussion. In 2004, William McCants and Kavian Milani published an early manuscript of Nuqṭatu'l-Kāf dated 1268 AH (1851–1852 CE). They found that this early manuscript differed only slightly from Browne's published version, even though Browne's edition was based on a much later manuscript dated 1327 AH (1909 CE). Milani later identified two still earlier manuscripts, known as the Haifa and Tehran manuscripts, which appear to preserve an earlier form of the text. These manuscripts lack two extended sections found in the 1851–1852 manuscript and in Browne's edition: one on the life and status of Subh-i-Azal and another on later "manifestations". The absence of these sections from the earlier manuscripts suggests that the pro-Azal material was added later by redactors. Milani therefore concluded that Nuqṭatu'l-Kāf is an early Bábí history finalized around 1852, but not simply the untouched work of Hājī Mīrzā Jānī alone; rather, it appears to have been produced or compiled in stages by multiple authors.

Scholars therefore differ over how far the published text of Nuqṭatu'l-Kāf reflects later Azalí redaction. Cole argued that Browne's edition preserved redactions made during the Baháʼí–Azalí split, while McCants and Milani, on the basis of the 1851–1852 manuscript, concluded that the text underwent little substantive redaction before Browne's publication. The manuscript evidence nevertheless indicates that the textual history of Nuqṭatu'l-Kāf is complex: the work preserves valuable early Bábí material, but its authorship, compilation, and later Azalí shaping remain debated. In particular, the manuscript tradition suggests that sections strengthening Subh-i-Azal's status were added after an earlier version of the text had already circulated. For this reason, Nuqṭatu'l-Kāf should not be treated as the untouched original history of early Bábism or as straightforward evidence for Subh-i-Azal's early authority. Browne also received memoirs and chronicles written by both Azalís and Baháʼís in response to the publication of Nuqṭatu'l-Kāf, deposited them in his collection, but wrote little about them.

== Leadership ==
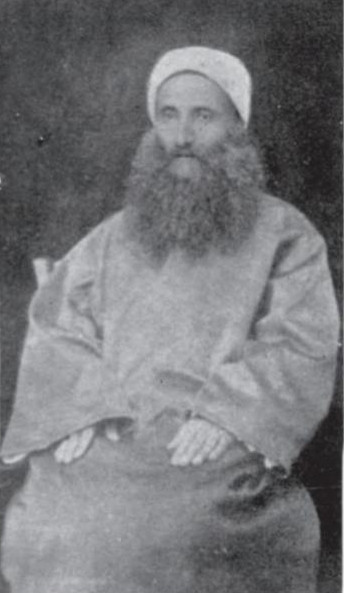
Subh-i-Azal at a younger age, date unknown.

=== Takur uprising ===
The Bábí community was engaged in several pitched military confrontations with the government from 1848 to 1851. Subh-i-Azal allied himself with a faction led by Azim, and in 1852 coordinated a new militant uprising in Takur, Iran. This new upheaval was apparently timed to coincide with an attempt to assassinate Naser al-Din Shah, which was organized by Azīm.

The uprising failed, and the botched assassination attempt resulted in the entire Bábí community being blamed and severely punished by the government. Many thousand Bábís were killed. Subh-i-Azal took up a disguise to escape Iran and joined a cohort of exiles in Baghdad.

After Azim's death in 1852, Subh-i-Azal became the clear head of the remaining militant faction of the Bábís, which remained wedded to a vision of radical political activism; representing what Amanat describes as a preoccupation with, "the Shi'ite vision of a utopian political order under the aegis of the Imam of the age". This militant orientation, including association with the faction involved in the attempted assassination of Naser al-Din Shah, later became one of the major points of contrast between Subh-i-Azal and Baháʼu'lláh, whose writings in Baghdad emphasized moral reform, persuasion, and the avoidance of violence or armed struggle.

=== Baghdad ===
In Baghdad, Subh-i-Azal kept his whereabouts secret and lived secluded from the Bábí community, maintaining contact through agents termed "witnesses of the Bayān". According to the Baháʼí historian Sayyid Mahdī Dahajī, Subh-i-Azal appointed seven people to this role; Dahajī names three of them as Sayyid Muhammad Isfahānī, Mullā Muhammad Ja'far Narāqī, and his brother Mullā Muhammad Taqī. Shoghi Effendi gives the total number of witnesses as eighteen. Baháʼu'lláh acted as Subh-i-Azal's principal supporter and defender, publicly acknowledged his authority, and criticized those who, in his view, exaggerated Subh-i-Azal's station. This role made Baháʼu'lláh the leading intermediary between Subh-i-Azal and many Bábís, consistent with the Báb's instruction that he protect Subh-i-Azal. Baháʼu'lláh also encouraged the circulation of Subh-i-Azal's major Baghdad-period work, Kitab-i-Nur.

The Bábí community in Iran remained fragmented after the persecutions of 1852–53, and several competing claims to authority emerged. One of the most significant challengers to Subh-i-Azal was Mírzá Asad Alláh Khúʼí, known as Dayyán, who claimed to be He whom God shall make manifest. Subh-i-Azal responded with a lengthy polemical work, Mustayqiz, in which he rejected Dayyán's claim and presented him as a dangerous rival. MacEoin notes that the text contains passages implying that Dayyán and one of his followers, Mírzá Ibráhím, should be killed. Smith states that Subh-i-Azal continued a policy of militancy against prominent Bábís who challenged his position and that Dayyán's murder appears to have been instigated by him. Dayyán was killed in 1856 by Mírzá Muḥammad of Māzandarān, an associate of Subh-i-Azal.

Early in the Baghdad period, tensions rose between Subh-i-Azal and Baháʼu'lláh. To avoid deepening the disunity and divisions within the Bábí community, Baháʼu'lláh withdrew to Kurdistan, where he lived in seclusion for two years. During his absence, the Bábí community in Baghdad became increasingly demoralized and divided, and Bábís eventually asked for him to be found and urged to return.

Subh-i-Azal's continued seclusion, reliance on intermediaries, and support for militant policies contributed to his alienation from a substantial portion of the Bábís, some of whom gave their allegiance to other claimants. Baháʼí sources have attributed this alienation to his incompetence and cowardice, while MacEoin argues that his concealment should instead be understood in light of the Shi'a practice of taqiyya and the model of the hidden twelfth Imam. MacEoin further notes that Subh-i-Azal was acting on instructions attributed to the Báb and that the idea of a hidden walī would not necessarily have troubled Bábís. Nevertheless, his concealment limited his direct contact with the wider Bábí community, while Baháʼu'lláh was accessible, outward-facing, and increasingly authoritative among Bábís in Baghdad.

After returning from Kurdistan in 1856, Baháʼu'lláh worked to reunite and morally reorient the dispirited Bábí community through personal leadership, correspondence, and writings that circulated among Bábís in Iraq and Iran. These writings emphasized spiritual discipline, ethical conduct, humane behavior, and the avoidance of violence or armed struggle, contributing to a revival of the community's moral and spiritual life. Increasingly, many Bábís viewed him as a spiritual leader in his own right and a central object of devotion. His position as the community's most visible leader came to be recognized not only by many Bábís but also by members of the general public, notables, and Persian and Ottoman officials.

=== Edirne ===
In 1863, most of the Bábís were summoned by the Ottoman authorities to Istanbul, where they remained for four months before being exiled to Edirne from 12 December 1863 to 12 August 1868. During the journey to Istanbul, Baháʼu'lláh privately advanced his claim to be the messianic figure promised in the Bayān, a claim that he later proclaimed more openly in Edirne. This development produced a permanent schism between Baháʼu'lláh and Subh-i-Azal. Subh-i-Azal responded by advancing claims of his own and by resisting the doctrinal changes introduced by Baháʼu'llāh, but his efforts to preserve traditional Bábism attracted limited support.

According to Baháʼī accounts, Subh-i-Azal attempted to poison Baháʼu'lláh in Edirne in 1865. Mirza Aqa Khan Kermani, a son-in-law of Subh-i-Azal, later gave a different account, claiming in Hasht-Bihisht that Baháʼu'lláh had poisoned himself while attempting to poison Subh-i-Azal. (Note: Kirmani made this claim in Hasht-Bihisht, parts of which are summarized by Edward G. Browne in "Note W" of his translation of A Traveller's Narrative.) The historian Peter Smith regards the Baháʼi accounts of the incident as credible. The poisoning reportedly caused a severe illness and left Baháʼu'lláh with a tremor in his hand for the rest of his life. Juan Cole notes that Salmání, Baháʼu'lláh's barber and personal attendant, reported another attempt by Subh-i-Azal to have Baháʼu'lláh killed in the late winter of 1866, in which Subh-i-Azal allegedly tried to persuade Salmání to murder Baháʼu'lláh while attending him in the bath. In March 1866, Baháʼu'lláh responded with a formal written declaration to Subh-i-Azal in the Sūri-yi Amr and began referring to his followers as Baháʼís.

The dispute led to an approximately year-long separation that ended in a definite schism. The two brothers separated their households, and the Bábís in Iraq and Iran divided into three groups: Azalís, Baháʼís, and those who remained undecided. In February–March 1867, representatives of all three groups gathered in Baghdad for debates; according to Cole, most of the undecided Bábís soon joined the Baháʼís, who were already in the majority. In Edirne, the group of about 100 Bábís remained socially intermixed until the summer of 1867, when they began living separately according to their loyalties.

A further crisis occurred in August or September 1867, when Sayyid Muhammad Isfahānī, an Azalí, instigated a public challenge between the two brothers in order to settle their competing claims. On a Friday morning, Subh-i-Azal challenged Baháʼu'llāh to appear that afternoon at the Sultan Selim Mosque for a public confrontation involving mubāhalih, a ritual appeal for divine judgment through reciprocal imprecation. Baháʼu'lláh went to the mosque, where a crowd had gathered, and sent a messenger to Subh-i-Azal's home to remind him of the challenge. Azal replied that the confrontation would have to be postponed. That night, Baháʼu'lláh wrote to Azal proposing that the challenge be completed on either Sunday or Monday, but Azal did not respond and did not appear on either day. Baháʼís interpreted Azal's failure to appear at his own challenge as a sign of weakness; the episode caused him to lose face among many Bábís and further damaged his credibility. News of the incident quickly spread to Iran, where most Bábís still lived.

The further exile of both parties was instigated in part by complaints that Subh-i-Azal and his chief supporter, Sayyid Muḥammad Isfahānī, made to Ottoman officials, accusing Baháʼu'lláh of rebellion, association with Bulgarian revolutionaries, and plans to create disorder. An Ottoman investigation reportedly cleared Baháʼu'lláh of these charges but concluded that the religious claims of Baháʼu'lláh and Subh-i-Azal could become a source of public disorder. The Ottoman authorities therefore separated the two groups, sending Baháʼu'lláh and his followers to ʻAkká and Subh-i-Azal and his family to Famagusta, Cyprus.

At the time of this exile, the division had been resolved overwhelmingly in Baháʼu'lláh’s favor, with the vast majority of Bábís accepting his claim. Among the exiles, Subh-i-Azal’s adherents consisted of his family and only two other followers, Sayyid Muḥammad Isfahānī and Áqā Jān Big-i Kaj-Kulāh, while Baháʼu'lláh was accompanied by his family and about seventy followers.

=== Cyprus ===
The formal exile of Subh-i-Azal ended in 1881, when Cyprus was acquired by Britain in the aftermath of the Russo-Turkish War (1877–1878), but he remained on the island for the rest of his life until his death on 29 April 1912. He remained elusive and secretive, living off a British pension and being perceived as a Muslim holy man by the people of Cyprus, even receiving a Muslim burial. From Cyprus he seemed to have little contact with the Bábís in Iran.

Harry Luke, an official of the British Colonial Office, commented in 1913 that after Subh-i-Azal's arrival in Cyprus,

Now occurred a curious phenomenon. Although doctrinally there was little to distinguish the two parties, the basis of the schism being a personal question, the one waxed exceedingly while the other waned. Rapidly the Ezelis dwindled to a handful, and soon were confined, almost entirely, to the members of Subh-i-Ezel's devoted family.

On Cyprus, Subh-i-Azal was in contact with Edward Granville Browne, who visited him there during March 1890. Subh-i-Azal provided Browne with copies of some of the works of the Báb in his possession and with his own succinct account of the history of the Bábí movement. He also exchanged correspondence with A. L. M. Nicolas, a French diplomat in Iran, and for whom he wrote Conduct of The Heads of States (Persian: سلوک رؤسا با مردم), a political treatise referencing events in France of the previous decade.

== Death ==
Subh-i-Azal started showing symptoms of an unidentified illness in July 1911. His condition then got worse in September of the same year, and he died on April 29, 1912. He was buried according to Islamic customs outside Famagusta, without the presence of the witnesses of the Bayān.

=== Succession ===
There are conflicting reports concerning Subh-i-Azal's succession, and uncertainty persisted after his death. He reportedly first intended to appoint his eldest son, Ahmad, but withdrew the appointment following a dispute between them. He then designated Hādī Dawlatābādī as his successor and leader of the Azalí community in Iran. Hādī later publicly recanted his faith in the Báb and Subh-i-Azal. He had been threatened with death by a local cleric, and despite his public recantation, he reportedly continued to be an Azalí leader in secret. Hādī, died in 1908, several years before Subh-i-Azal. Subh-i-Azal subsequently appointed Hādī's son, Yahyā Dawlatābādī (d. 1939), as his successor.There is little evidence that he actively directed the Azalí community or wrote extensively on Bábí religious subjects. Any identifiable chain of Azalí leadership appears to have become defunct during or following his tenure.

Subh-i-Azal's son Rizwan ʻAli wrote to C. D. Cobham on 11 July 1912:

[Subhi-i-Azal] before his death had nominated [as his executor or successor] the son of Aqā Mīrzā Muhammad Hādī of Dawlatābād.

This statement appears to refer to Yahyā Dawlatābādī, the son of Hādī Dawlatābādī. Other contemporary reports, however, indicated that the succession remained disputed. H. C. Lukach wrote to Browne on 5 September 1912:

It appears that Subhi-i-Azal left a letter saying that he of his sons who resembled him most closely in his mode of life and principles was to be his successor. The point as to which of the sons fulfils this condition has not yet been decided; consequently all the children would appear at present to be co-heirs... No steps have, as far as I am aware, yet been taken to elect a walī [i.e. successor or executor].

Jalāl Azal, a grandson of Subh-i-Azal who rejected the reported appointments of Hādī and Yahyā Dawlatābādī, told William Miller sometime between 1967 and 1971 that Subh-i-Azal had appointed no successor.

=== Shrine ===
A small shrine was built in the place of Subh-i-Azal's grave in Famagusta in the 1960s. According to a local Bahá’í, its building was orchestrated by a wealthy Iranian woman, who claimed to be a relative of Subh-i-Azal. Later, in the 1990s, the shrine was in the care of Subh-i-Azal's grandson, Rida Ezel.

== Impact and legacy ==
Subh-i-Azal's leadership of the Bábí movement led to the formation of Azalísm (Persian: ازلیه Azalíyye), a distinct branch of Bábism that followed his authority as the appointed successor of the Báb. His followers, known as Azalís (Persian: ازلیان Azalíyân), continued to uphold the teachings of the Báb while rejecting the messianic claims of Baháʼu'lláh and others who claimed to be "He whom God shall make manifest". The Baháʼí–Azalí split in the 1860s resulted in the majority of Bábís following Baháʼu'lláh, who founded the Baháʼí Faith, while a smaller group remained loyal to Subh-i-Azal, forming the Azalí community. By 1890, Edward Granville Browne estimated that only a small fraction—perhaps three or four out of every hundred Bábís—were Azalís, with the rest accepting Baháʼu'lláh.

=== Distinguishing characteristics ===
Azalís adhered to a conservative interpretation of Bábism, emphasizing the laws and teachings of the Báb as outlined in the Bayān. They rejected Baháʼu'lláh's claim in 1863 as premature, arguing that the world must first fully accept the Báb's laws before the promised messiah could appear. This Azalí reading was not shared by many other Bábís. The Báb's writings repeatedly present the recognition of He whom God shall make manifest as the central purpose of the Bábí revelation. The Báb instructed his followers to recognize the promised figure through independent investigation, warning them not to make even the Báb's own writings, his own authority, or the authority of leading Bábís such as the Letters of the Living, a barrier to recognizing him. He also referred to the advent of the promised figure in terms that many Bábís understood as implying relative imminence, including references to "year nine" and "year nineteen". The emergence of numerous claimants to this station after the Báb's execution also indicates that many Bábís did not regard the promised figure as necessarily belonging to a remote future.

Denis MacEoin characterizes Azalí Bábism as a conservative continuation of the original Bábí movement, marked by resistance to innovation, a more esoteric religious orientation, and continued opposition to the Qajar state. Azalís also retained a stronger commitment to political activism than the Baháʼí community, which emphasized non-involvement in partisan and revolutionary politics. The two groups differed in their approaches to reform. While Azalís were more closely associated with political activism and opposition to the Qajar state, Baháʼí leaders advanced many ideas associated with later reformist and constitutionalist thought through religious teachings and community-building initiatives. Baháʼu'lláh and ʻAbdu'l-Bahá advocated principles such as consultative government, democracy, justice, rule of law, universal education, the elimination of prejudice, the advancement of women, and the moral and material progress of society. Many of these ideas appeared in Baháʼí writings decades before the Persian Constitutional Revolution. Baháʼís put such principles into practice through elected local councils rather than clerical leadership, modern schools open beyond the Baháʼí community, including schools for girls, literacy and educational initiatives for women, and other forms of social reform.

=== Involvement in Persian reform movements ===
Several Azalís played significant roles in secular and constitutional reform movements in Iran, particularly during the Persian Constitutional Revolution of 1905–1911. Prominent Azalís, including Subh-i-Azal’s sons-in-law Sheikh Ahmad Rouhi and Mirza Aqa Khan Kermani, as well as Yahyā Dawlatābādī, his appointed successor, were influential in advocating for constitutional and secular reforms. Their writings and activities contributed to the push for ending the Iranian absolute monarchy.

The Azalí community itself faced suppression as a perceived heresy, and accusations of being an Azalí were often sufficient to discredit individuals in the eyes of the public. The practice of taqiyya among Azalís further complicated efforts to identify their involvement in reformist and constitutionalist movements.

Even though Baháʼí leaders supported constitutional principles in their writings, but avoided openly aligning the Baháʼí community with the Constitutional Revolution. This caution was intended to avoid provoking opponents of the Baháʼí Faith and endangering the vulnerable Baháʼí community to further scapegoating and persecution amid the political conflict; it also has reflected concern that visible Baháʼí support could harm the constitutional movement itself by allowing opponents to portray it as Baháʼí-inspired. Baháʼís instead promoted reformist ideas through a culturally familiar religious language and through practical initiatives, including elected community institutions, modern education, girls' schools, women's literacy and public education, ethical reform, and other social activities.

=== Practice of taqiyya ===
The practice of taqiyya (dissimulation) was widespread among Azalís, justified as a response to the violent oppression faced by the Bábí community. While some prominent Bábí leaders discouraged taqiyya and openly declared their faith, often resulting in martyrdom, Azalís embraced it as an imperative requirement. This practice became deeply ingrained, with some Azalí leaders, such as Mirza Aqa Khan Kermani and Shaykh Ahmad Ruhi, openly recanting their faith or altering Bábí teachings and history in their works to conceal their affiliations. Azalí literature glorified taqiyya as a virtue, classifying it into various levels of concealment, which allowed the community to operate covertly but also contributed to their obscurity.

Some scholars caution that the Azalí practice of taqiyya complicates the source record: Manuchehri and others note that prominent Azalís such as Mirza Aqa Khan Kermani and Sheikh Ahmad Rouhi are reported to have altered or recast Babi teachings and history in their writings, affecting the reliability of some Azalí-origin accounts. Armin Eschraghi similarly argues that strict adherence to dissimulation led the remaining Azalís to merge into their Muslim surroundings and largely disappear as a distinct group, citing the case of Hádí Dawlatābādí, who is said to have cursed the Báb from a mosque pulpit in the late 1880s to protect himself.

=== Decline of Azalísm ===
Following the Constitutional Revolution, the Azalí community stagnated and gradually disappeared as an organized entity. By the end of the 20th century, their numbers had dwindled to at most a few thousand, primarily in Iran, significantly outnumbered by the millions of Baháʼí adherents worldwide. The lack of an acknowledged leader or central organization after Subh-i-Azal’s death in 1912 contributed to this decline. Membership became secretive, often running along family lines, and converts were rare. Estimates in the 1970s suggested between 500 and 5,000 Azalís remained in Iran, with a small number in Uzbekistan by 2009.

=== Notable Azalí figures ===
Despite their small numbers, Azalís included several prominent Iranian political and literary figures. In addition to Rouhi, Kermani, and Dawlatābādī, others such as Jamāl al-Dīn Esfahānī and Malik al-Motakallemīn were associated with Azalí Bábism and influenced constitutional reforms. The seven witnesses of the Bayān who remained loyal to Subh-i-Azal included Sayyid Muhammad Isfahani, Mulla Muhammad Ja'far Naraqi, Mulla Muhammad Taqi, Haji Sayyid Muhammad (Isfahani), Haji Sayyid Jawad (al-Karbala'i), Mirza Muhammad Husayn Mutawalli-bashi Qummi, and Mulla Rajab 'Ali Qahir. Baháʼī sources claim that the remaining 11 witnesses later became Baháʼīs.

=== Legacy of Subh-i-Azal ===
Subh-i-Azal’s leadership and the subsequent formation of Azalísm left a complex legacy. While his followers played a role in Iran’s constitutional reforms, their adherence to taqiyya and the lack of centralized leadership after his death limited their lasting impact. Ahmad Bahhāj (1853–1933), one of Subh-i-Azal’s sons, later moved to Haifa and appears to have become a Baháʼī, being buried in a Baháʼī cemetery. Jalal Azal, his grandson, initially showed signs of aligning with the Baháʼí Faith but later opposed ʻAbdu'l-Bahā. The small shrine built at Subh-i-Azal’s grave in Famagusta in the 1960s, cared for by his grandson Rida Ezel in the 1990s, remains a minor testament to his legacy.

== Works ==
One of the best known works of Subh-i-Azal is the Book of Light (Persian: کتاب نور, romanized: kitāb-i-nūr), written in Baghdad during the first few years after the death of the Báb (1852-1853). The Book of Light is a book in the style of the Qur'ān, composed of 77 suwar consisting of Arabic āyāt, that is, in the first of the five grades of Bábí revelation. Subh-i-Azal describes it as proof of his status of successor (waliyy) to the Báb, in his later work named Sleeper Awakened (Arabic: مستيقظ, romanized: mustayqiẓ). The opening chapter, titled Chapter of the Bayān (Arabic: سورة البيان, romanized: sūrah al-bayān), consists of seven verses, in imitation of the Al-Fatiha.

Subh-i-Azal wrote multiple works referencing the Bayān. Laws of the Bayān (Persian: احکام بیان, romanized: aḥkām-i-bayān) is an Arabic explanation of the laws and ordinances of the Bayān, arranged into Unities (wāḥid), similarly to the Bayān itself. Supplement to the Persian Bayān (Persian: ذیل بیان فارسی, romanized: dhīl-i-bayān-i-fārsī) is an extension of the original text of the Persian Bayān, from 9th Unity, 11th Gate up to 11th Unity, 19th Gate (the same length as the Arabic Bayān). The Mirror of Bayān (Persian: کتاب مرات البيان, romanized: kitāb-i-mir'āt-al-bayān) is composed of 131 Gates (chapters) in four of the five Bayānic modes (verses, prayers, sermons, addresses).

Large collections of Subh-i-Azal's works are found in the British Museum Library Oriental Collection, London; in the Browne Collection at Cambridge University; at the Bibliothèque Nationale in Paris; and at Princeton University. In the English introduction to "Personal Reminiscences of the Babi Insurrection at Zanjan in 1850," Browne lists thirty-eight titles as being among the works of Subh-i-Azal, citing a bibliography prepared by Subh-i-Azal's son, Rizwān ʿAlī. In "Materials for the Study of the Babi Religion", Browne lists works of Subh-i-Azal collected by him, with a short description of each one of them.

=== Political views ===
Subh-i-Azal's political views combine esoteric thought with modern ideas in what Juan Cole describes as "a strange amalgam of Isma'ili-like esotericism, approval of monarchy, and radical republicanism." Subh-i-Azal believed that a leader elected by the people should rule collectively, praising the French republican leader, Leon Gambetta. In a treatise written for A. L. M. Nicolas, Subh-i-Azal states that it is permissible for a tyrannical leader to be removed by a popular revolt, but it should be done without bloodshed if possible. According to Cole, this philosophy brought the interest of the reformist intellectuals of the Persian Constitutional Revolution.

For a leader with a divine mandate, Subh-i-Azal also considers absolute rule to be acceptable, under the condition of being just. The ideal leader, to Subh-i-Azal, is someone who combines temporal and spiritual leadership. Cole considers this possible evidence of his own political ambitions, and notes that some of his followers during the Constitutional Revolution wanted to bring him to Teheran and make him king.
