= Literary criticism in Iran =

Literary criticism (Persian: نقد ادبی) is a relatively young discipline in Iran since there had been no comparable tradition of literary criticism before the nineteenth century, when European influence first began to penetrate the country.

== Classical tradition ==
Literary criticism in the European sense never existed

=== Pre-Islamic period ===
No text devoted to literary criticism has survived from the period before Islam. However, there is a tantalizing mention of the titles of such works, such as Karvand. There is the possibility that Iranian elites were familiar with Greek literature and philosophy. Greek culture was cultivated during the philhellenic Arsacid dynasty, so much so that "in the courts of Arsacid kings Greek plays were performed in the original language". Even as late as the Sassanid Empire, Greek philosophers took refuge in Iran in the academy at Gundeshapur. However, it remains a matter for speculation how much influence Greek ideas had on the literature of the period before Islam.

=== Samanid period ===
The oldest surviving work of Persian literary criticism is the Muqaddamah-i Shāhnāmah-i Abū Manṣūrī (Introduction to Abū Manṣūr's Shāhnāmah). "This work deals with the myths and legends of the Shāhnāmah and is considered the oldest surviving example of Persian prose."

During much of this period, commentary on poetry would take the form of either slander or excessive praise, that is "sophistry or exaggeration of trivial errors in the poetry of rivals."

The sarcastic remarks occasionally encountered in the poetry books... relating to rival poets are slanderous in nature and not genuinely critical. Conversely, when poets wrote favorably about each other, they merely exchanged flattery. Shahīd and Rūdakī admired one another and Rūdakī was praised by Kasā'ī, Daqīqī, Farrukhī, and ʿUnsurī; ʿUnsurī and Ghazā'irī, however, belittled each other's works.

=== Seljuq period ===
During the Seljuq period, with the growing influence of Arabic literature a more technical style of literary criticism (naqd-i fannī) became predominant.

Tarjumān al-Balāghah by Muḥammad b. ʿUmar Rādūyānī "illustrates seventy-three types of rhetorical figures with Persian poems cited as examples in each case." Rashīd al-Dīn Muḥammad b. Muḥammad Vaṭvāṭ in his Ḥadā'iq al-Siḥr gives "different definitions of rhetorical figures." Kaykāvūs b. Iskandar in his Qābūs'nāmah says this of prose style: "In Arabic letters rhymed prose is a sign of distinction, whereas it is disapproved in letters written in Persian, and much better omitted. Let all the language you use be elevated, metaphorical, mellifluous and terse."

One of the most well-known classical works on literary criticism is Chahār Maqālah ("Four Essays") by Nizāmī ʿArūzī Samarqandī, in which the author treats the "definition, essence, and purpose" of poetry.

=== Mongol period ===
During this period, the compilation of tazkirāt (anthologies sg. tazkirah) produced "criticism of taste (naqd-i zawqī)" which really represented a return to the ad hominem attacks and rival name-calling which characterize much of what passes for literary criticism during most of Iranian history. "As with earlier periods, the practitioners of the criticism of taste belittled their predecessors in order to aggrandize themselves." Muḥammad ʿAwfī wrote two of the most notable: Jawāmiʿ al-hikāyat and Lubāb al-albāb. Dawlatshah Samarqandi's Tazkirāt al-shuʿarā "can be called the first true anthology of Persian poetry." Some other tazkirāt of this period:

- Miʿyār al-ashʿār, Khwājih Nāṣir al-Din Ṭūsī
- Ḥadā'iq al-ḥaqā'iq and Anīs al-ʿushshāq, Sharaf al-Dīn Muḥammad b. Ḥasan Rāmī
- Essays by ʿAbd al-Rahmān Jāmī "noteworthy only for their vulgarity"

Some critics went against this trend. Shams-i Qays Rāzī wrote al-Muʿjam fī maʿāyir ashʿār al-ʿajam which is "the most comprehensive text of its kind to that date" and treats prosodic technique and terminology and poetic feet, rhyme, and criticism in two volumes.

=== Safavid period ===
The poetry of the Safavid period is characteristic of what has since come to be known as sabk-i hindī ("Indian style," also called Ṣafavī or Iṣfahānī after the dynasty which nurtured it and its capital, respectively), marked by innovative and complex metaphor (as opposed to the simpler ʿIrāqī or Khurāsānī style of the earliest Persian poetry). Then, too, the primary literary critical works were tazkirāt, most prominently Tuḥfah-i Sāmī by Sām Mīrzā.

A sharp rebuke to the sabk-i hindī occurred in the eighteenth century when some poets urged a return to the "purer, simpler, and more lucid diction" of earlier poets. One of the more prominent members of this group was Azar Bigdeli, who compiled Ātashkadeh. This reaction against Indian-style Persian poetry has continued to the present century, when even Western scholars such as E.G. Browne have dismissed this tradition. Riza Qulī Khān Hidāyat (born 1800) in the introduction to his Majmaʿ al-Fuṣaḥā, writes the following:

Under the Turkomans and the Safavids, reprehensible styles appeared ... and since there were not binding rules for lyrics, the poets, following their sick natures and distorted tastes, began to write confused, vain, and nonsensical poems. They placed in their poetry insipid meanings instead of inspired truths, ugly contents ... instead of fine rhetorical devices and attractive innovations.

=== Qajar period ===
The Qajar period is not known for any contributions to the classical tradition of literary criticism in Iran, but rather for the appearance of liberal social critics who are better treated in the context of the Iranian reform movement.

== Modern literary criticism ==
Starting in the nineteenth century, criticism of literature became bound up with criticism of all the "entrenched political and economic institutions". This was due largely to the encroachment of European political and cultural influence which undermined the traditional society of Iran.

=== Historical background ===
During the nineteenth century, Iranians for the first time felt the impact of the industrializing European powers. Russia incurred the first serious defeat against Iran by a European power during the Russo-Persian War. The Treaty of Gulistan ceded large parts of Azerbaijan and Georgia to the Russian Empire. In Central Asia, Russia and Great Britain were waging a contest for influence and concessions. British interests in India compelled them to create the buffer state of Afghanistan. Iranian ambitions to recapture Herat, were constantly frustrated during the Anglo-Persian War and the city has remained a part of Afghanistan ever since. At the same time, European sea-traffic had bypassed the ancient Silk Road, which had been the backbone of Iran's economy since time immemorial. Traditional craftsmen could no longer compete with a flood of cheap, industrially produced goods from Europe. The nineteenth century was a traumatic period for much of the world as European imperial powers stretched their possessions over the globe, and Iran was no exception.

In the midst of all these setbacks, many Iranians awoke to an urgent sense of the need for reform. More and more Iranians left Iran to study in Europe. Translations into Persian of Western works began to appear with greater frequency. Even the Qajar princes themselves, who were most threatened by these changes, attempted stillborn reforms of their own (usually military or industrial) in an attempt to "catch up" with the West. It is therefore no surprise that the criticism of literature at this time assumed a strongly social-reformist dimension.

=== Rationalism ===
The intellectual underpinning of the new criticism was possible because of the rise of rational, critical thought. The European thinkers most popular to the growing class of reformist intellectuals were those of the European Enlightenment, such as René Descartes and Isaac Newton

The Iranian reform movement can be seen in the context of the earlier movements in Europe and North America whereby "philosophers and thinkers arose ... who, through their criticism, challenged deeply seated superstition, ignorance and injustice." An element common to these is the imagery of light (cf. Persian: rawshan'fikr "enlightened") and dark:

The movement these thinkers set in motion stood as a bulwark in defense of knowledge, learning, and reform, and, through the promotion of understanding and wisdom, sought to dispel the darkness of superstition and ignorance.[emphasis added]

=== Literary Critics ===
In the late Qajar period, from the late 19th century until the Iranian Constitutional Revolution, several themes are common among the new literary critics.

1. Realism, or "social critical realism"; critics discouraged imaginative or fanciful works and urged the production of literature which reflected real life.
2. Patriotism; critics appealed for the establishment of a strong national literature which would inspire patriotism in Iranians. Patriotism was considered a moral virtue and critics saw Iran's troubles grandly as the result of the decline in moral values.
3. "Protest"; by this term what is meant is the graphic, vitriolic language used by these critics in their attacks. In this sense the modern critics really continue the classical critical tradition, if it could be so called, based on slandering rivals.
4. Simplicity, that is, "rejection of affectation and abstruseness [of] language"; critics encouraged simple, clear prose and verse styles.

For this generation of thinkers, Iranian backwardness was the result of its culture's decay. They sought to place attention on the shortcomings of Iran's literature, because they thought that by revitalizing it they could lay the ground for the revitalization of their society. "Such an approach, of course, ignores the fact that illiteracy and ignorance are the outward manifestations of a poor, backward, medieval economy."

==== Mīrzā Fatḥ ʿAlī Ākhūnd'zādah ====
Considered the "founder of modern literary criticism in Iran," Mīrzā Fatḥ ʿAlī Ākhūnd'zādah used literary criticism as "the vehicle for his reformist impulse." Ākhund'zādah, because of his unfamiliarity with the Persian language and its prosody, made technical errors in some of his criticism, and was just as verbose and incoherent as those he attacked. However, he was the first critic in the modern tradition. He emphasized "realistic content in prose and poetry" and attacked the "decadence of Persian literature — a literature that failed to address the social needs of its time."

He published many works on literary criticism:

- Qirītīkah ("Criticism")
- Risālah-i īrād ("Fault-finding treatise")
- Fann-i kirītīkah ("Art of criticism")
- Darbārah-i Mullā-yi Rūmī va tasnīf-i ū ("On Rumi and his work")
- Darbārah-i nazm va nasr ("On verse and prose")
- Fihrist-i kitāb ("Preface to the book")
- Maktūb bih Mīrzā Āqā Tabrīzī ("Letter to Mīrzā Āqā Tabrīzī")
- Uṣūl-i nigārish ("Principles of writing")

==== Mīrzā Āqā Khān Kirmānī ====
Kirmānī emphasized "that it is meaning, not the mode of expression, that exerts the real influence on the reader," and thus discouraged the "destruction of the natural clarity of language ... by means of complicated metaphors, difficult words, long sentences, and complex expressions."

- Fann-i guftan va nivishtan ("Art of speaking and writing")
- Nāmah-i bāstān ("Book of ancient times")
- Āyīnah-i sekandarī ("Alexandrian mirror")
- Nāmah-i sukhanvārān ("Book of eloquent speakers"), or Āyīn-i sokhanvārī ("Rules of eloquence")
- Takvīn va tashrīʿ ("Creation and lawmaking")
- Sih maktūb ("Three letters")
- Sad khaṭābah ("One hundred lectures")

==== Mīrzā Malkum Khān ====
Mīrzā Malkum Khān's Armenian background and Christian religion may have played a part in the simplicity of his Persian prose. In his most important literary-critical work, Firqah-i Kaj'bīnān ("the squint-eyed sect"), Malkum Khān lampooned the language of various classes of society and encouraged a more concise prose style.

- Firqah-i Kaj'bīnān ("the squint-eyed sect")

==== ʿAbd al-Rahīm Ṭālibūf ====
Ṭālibūf (also spelled Talebov or Talibov), along with the earlier critics mentioned above, recognized the didactic use of literature to instruct people. He also helped to establish a simpler prose style (sādah'nivīsī) "especially in scientific prose in Iran."

- Nukhbah-i sipihrī ("Best of the sphere")
- Kitāb-i Aḥmad yā ṣafīnah-i Ṭālibī ("The book of Aḥmad, or the Ṭalibī Anthology")
- Fīzīk yā ḥikmat-i ṭabīʿīyah ("Physics or the natural order")
- Hay'at-i jadīd ("Modern life")
- Pandnāmah-i Mārkūs Uriliyūs, qayṣar-i rūm ("Book of Counsels of Marcus Aurelius, Caesar of Rome")
- Masālik al-muhsinīn ("Principles of Beneficents")
- Masā'il al-ḥayāt ("Questions of life")
- Izāhat dar khuṣūṣ-i āzādī ("Explanations on liberty")
- Siyāsat-i Ṭālibī ("The politics of Ṭālibī")

==== Zayn al-ʿĀbidīn Marāghah'ī ====
In his Sīyāhat'nāmah-i Ibrāhīm Bayk, Marāghah'ī stressed love of country. "He found Persian literature preoccupied with love and lyricism and negligent of social and national issues." Marāghah'ī put his simple prose style into use.

- Sīyāhat'nāmah-i Ibrāhīm Bayk
