= Takur =

Takur تکور
- Village
- Location within Iran
- Coordinates: 31°10′33″N 61°43′00″E
- Country: Iran
- Province: Sistan and Baluchestan
- County: Hirmand
- Bakhsh: Central
- Rural District: Margan

Population (2006)
  - Total: 97
- Time zone: UTC+3:30 (IRST)
  - Summer (DST): UTC+4:30 (IRDT)

Takur (Persian: تکور, also Romanized as Takūr; also known as Deh-e Takūr and Takor) is a village in Margan Rural District, in the Central District of Hirmand County, Sistan and Baluchestan Province, Iran. At the 2006 census, its population was 97, divided within 20 families.
