= Fin Bathhouse =

Historic bathhouse in Kashan, Iran

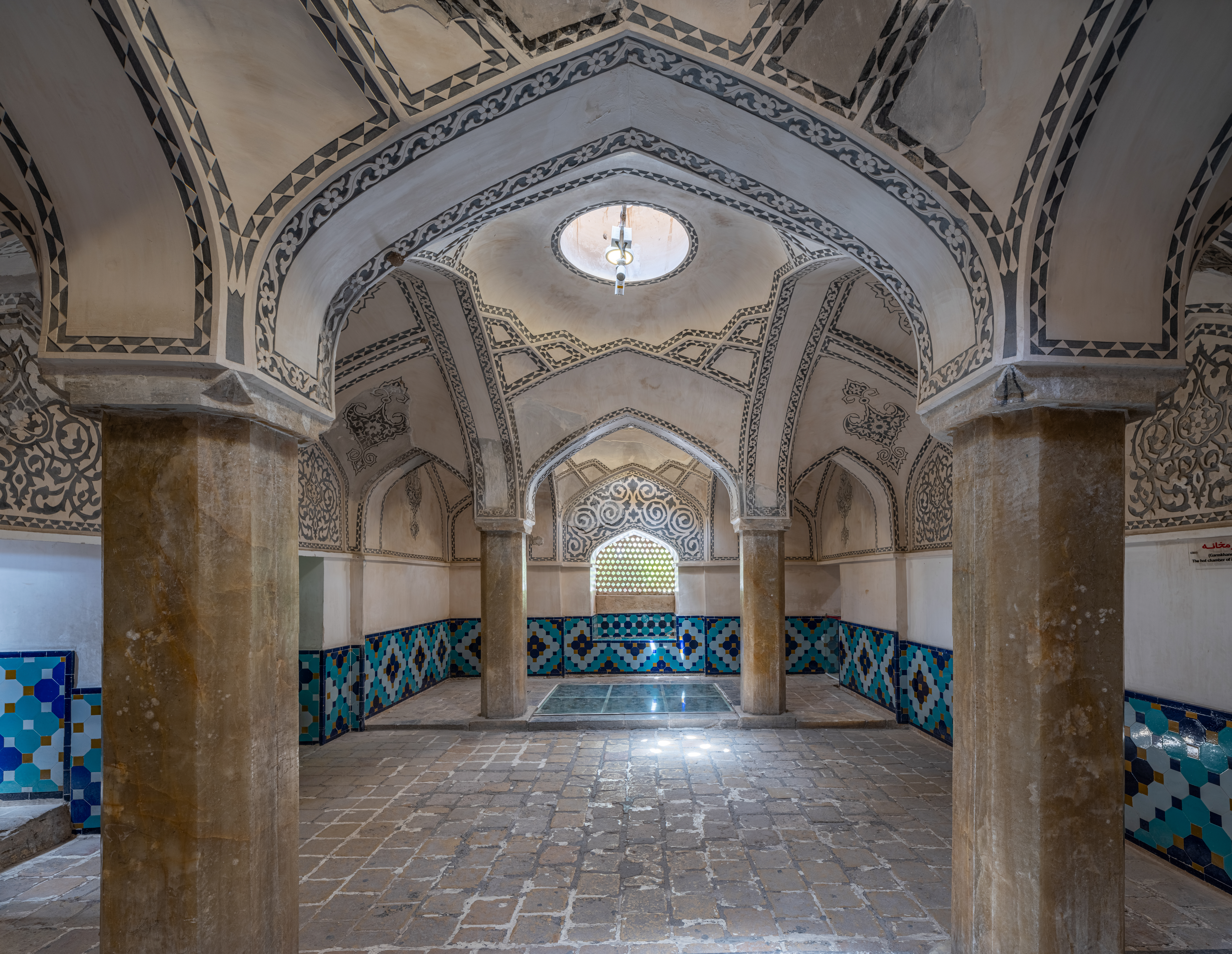
- Interactive map of Fin Bathhouse
- Location: Fin Garden, Kashan, Iran

Fin Bathhouse (Persian: حمام فین) is a "bath museum" in Fin garden, Kashan. It is the location of Amir Kabir's assassination on 10 January 1852. This bathhouse consists of one large and one small bath.

The construction of a small bath is related to the Safavid era and has been created with the original garden building. By building a large bath in the time of Fath Ali Shah, the large bath was allocated to state dignitaries, becoming known as the Royal Bath. In contrast, the small bath was used by the general population. Remarkably, both baths had all the traditional features and architectural elements of an Iranian bathhouse. In 1314 HS, the Fin Bathhouse was registered as a national monument and in 2011, it was registered in the UNESCO World Heritage List.
