= Fin Garden =

UNESCO World Heritage Site in Iran

Fin Garden باغ فین
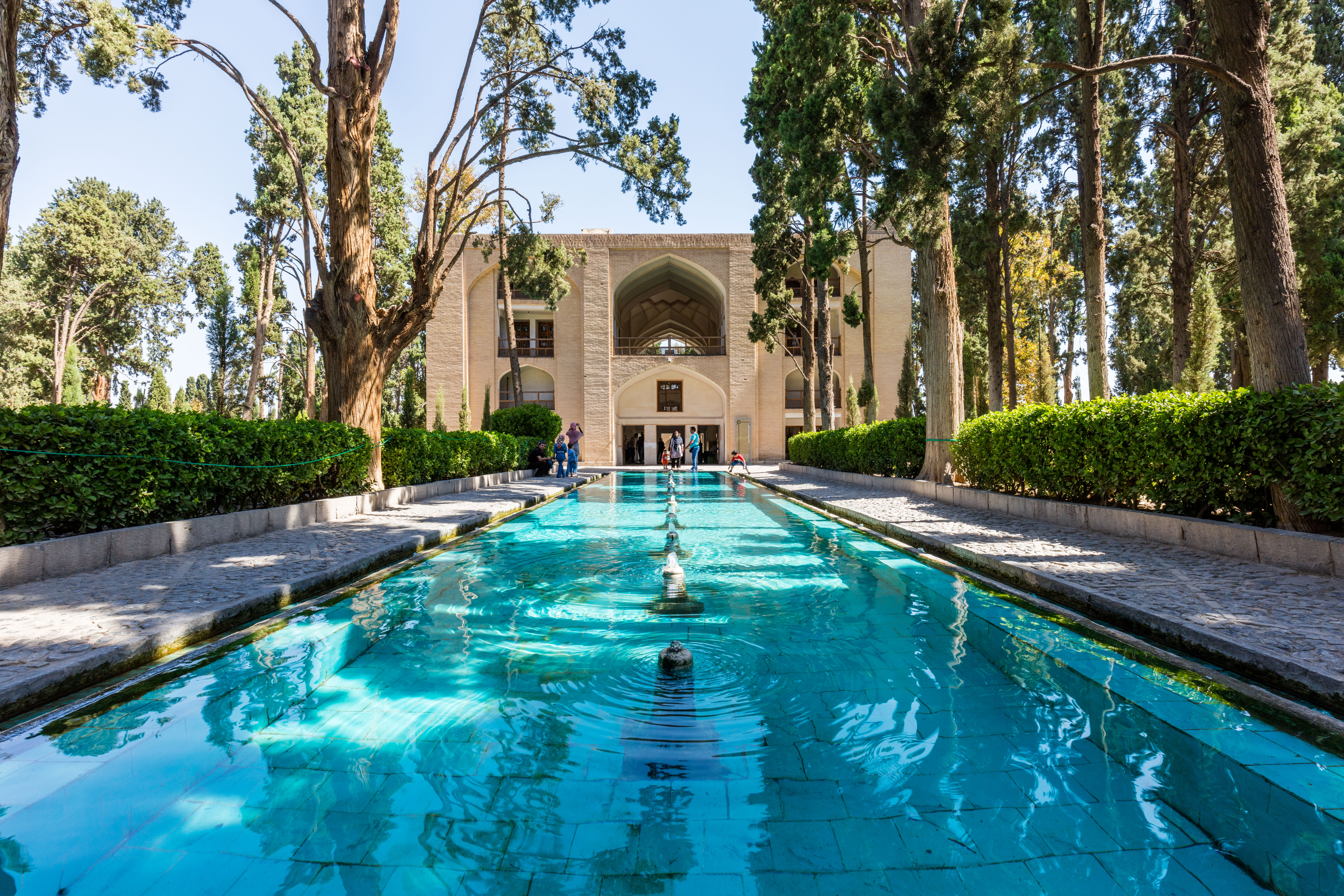

- Location within Iran
- 33°56′47″N 51°22′21″E
- Location: Kashan, Isfahan Province, Iran

UNESCO World Heritage Site
- Official name: Fin Garden
- Type: Cultural
- Criteria: i,ii, iii , iv, vi
- Designated: 2011 (35th session)
- Reference no.
- Region: Asia-Pacific

Iran National Heritage List
- Official name: Fin Garden
- Type: Persian Garden
- Designated: 1935
- Reference no.: 238
- Conservation organization: Cultural Heritage, Handicrafts and Tourism Organization of Iran

Fin Garden (Persian: باغ فین, romanized: Bagh-e Fin) is a historic Persian garden located in Kashan, Iran. It contains Kashan's Fin Bathhouse, where Amir Kabir, the Qajar era chancellor, was assassinated by the order of Naser al-Din Shah Qajar in 1852. Completed in 1590, the Fin Garden is the oldest extant garden in Iran.

== History ==
The origins of the garden may be anterior to the Safavid era; some sources indicate that the garden has been relocated from another place, but no clear picture of it has been found.

The settlements of the garden in its present form was built during the reign of Abbas the Great (r. 1587–1629), as a traditional bagh near the village of Fin, located a few kilometres southwest of Kashan.

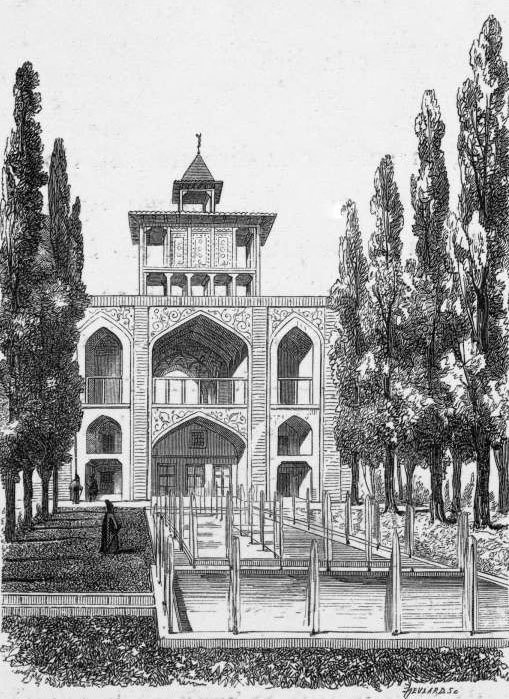
Drawing by Pascal Coste, 1840

The garden subsequently suffered from neglect and was damaged several times until, in 1935, it was listed as a national property of Iran. UNESCO declared the garden a World Heritage Site on 18 July 2012.

== Structure ==
The garden covers 2.3 hectares with a main yard surrounded by ramparts with four circular towers. In keeping with many of the Persian gardens of this era, the Fin Garden employs a great many water features.

The source of water circulating inside the garden is from a qanat called Soleymanié (Persian: سلیمانیه, lit. 'Of Solomon'). The "mother well" is located two kilometres upstream, with 14 service wells along the course. The average discharge is 350 L/s.

== National Museum of Kashan ==
The National Museum of Kashan, built in 1968, is situated in the western part of Fin Garden. It contains archaeological, ethnological and crafts. The archaeological objects were excavated in Chogha Zanbil, Teppe Hasanlu, and the nearby site of Tepe Sialk.

== Gallery ==
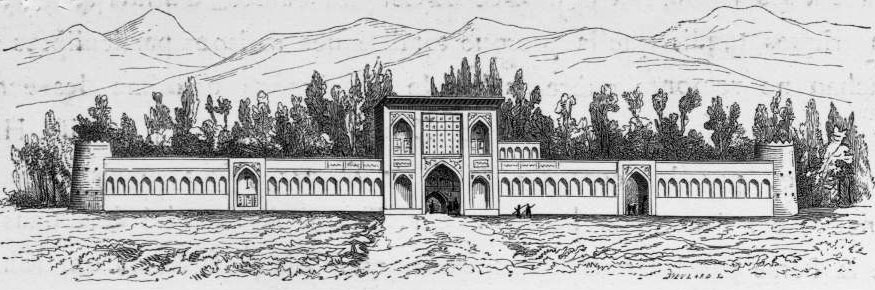
Fin garden by Pascal Coste, 1840

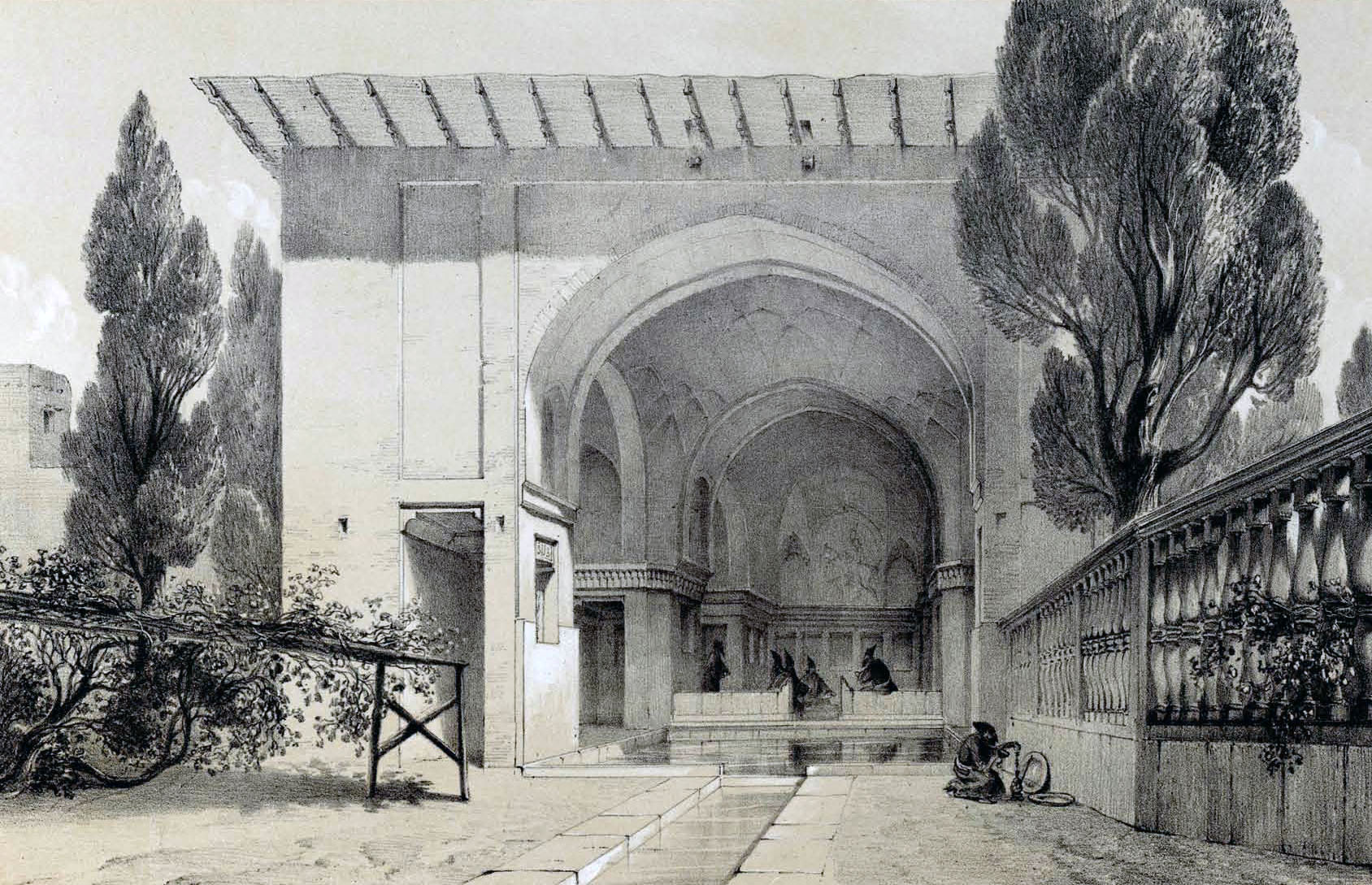
Fin garden by Eugène Flandin, 1840

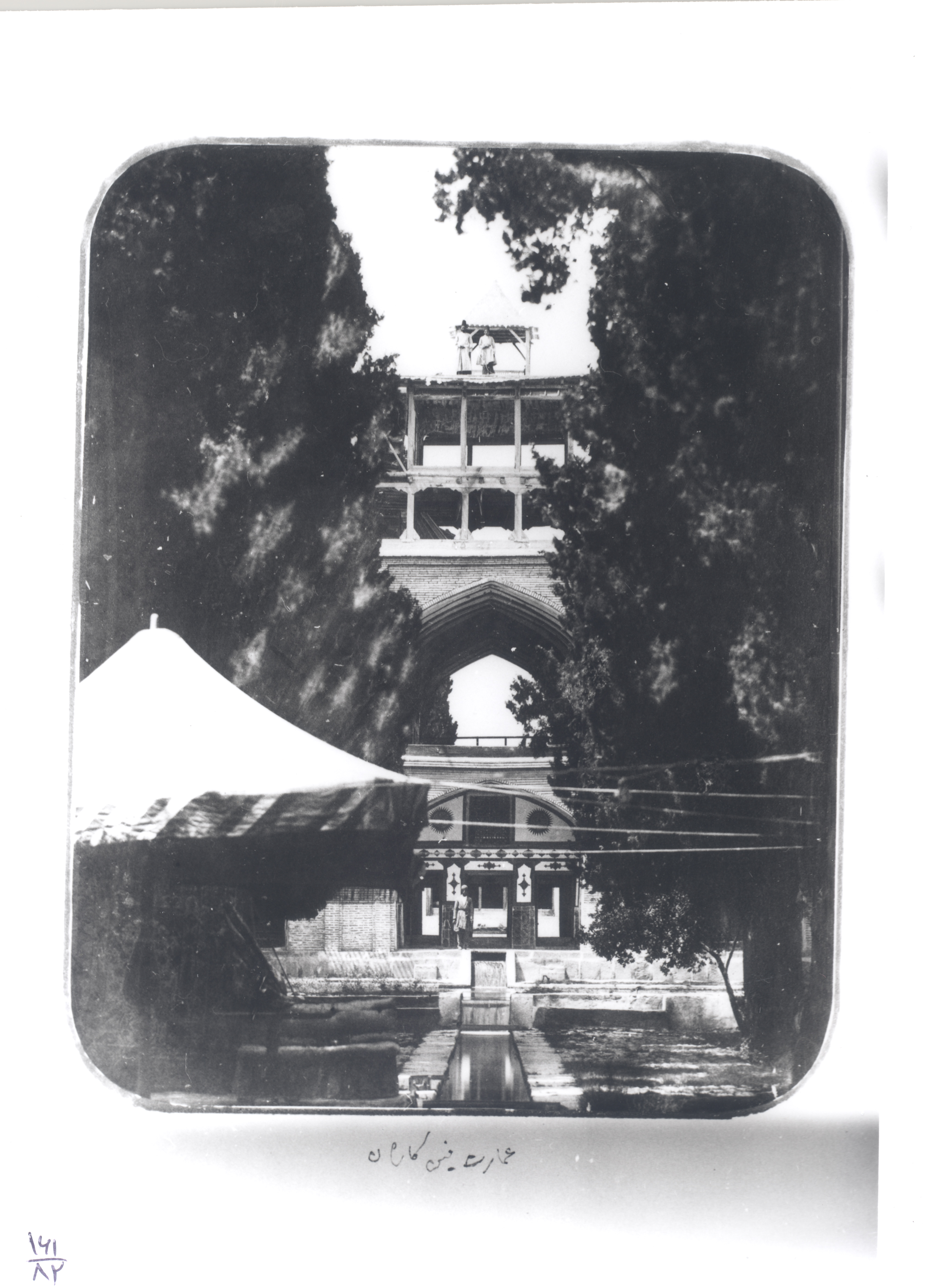
Qajar era photograph of the Fin garden

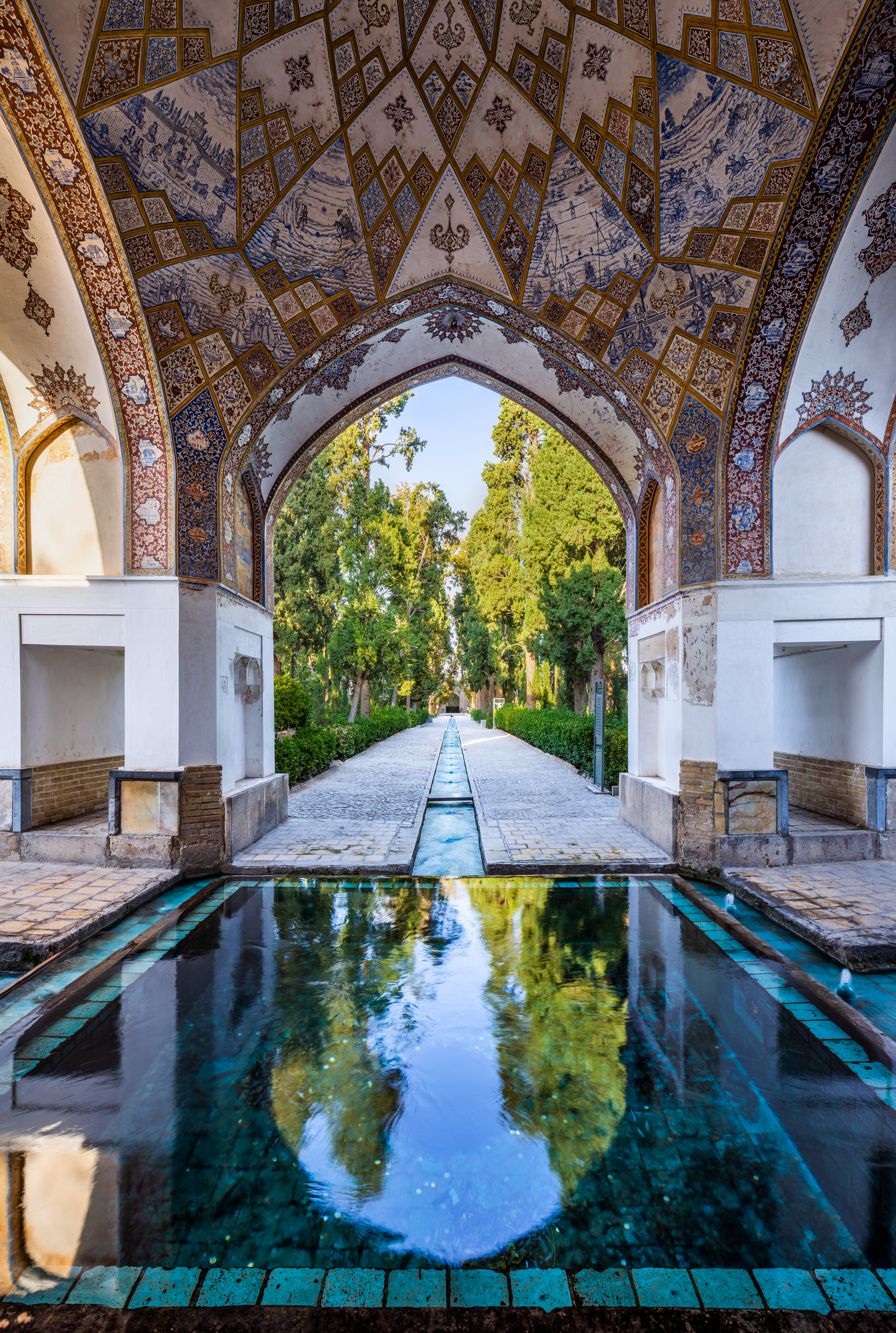
Kushak, part of the Bagh-e Fin Garden in Kashan

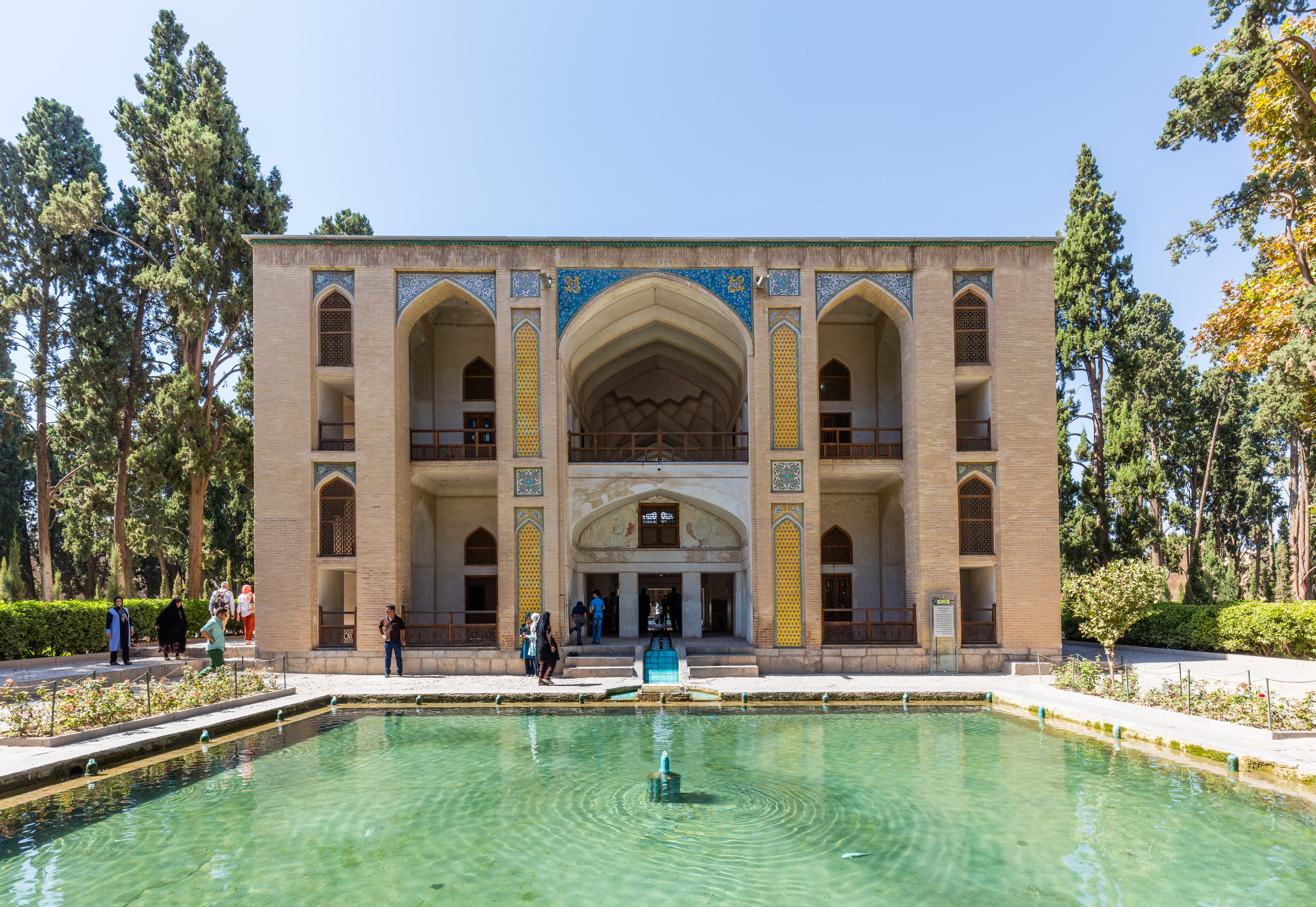

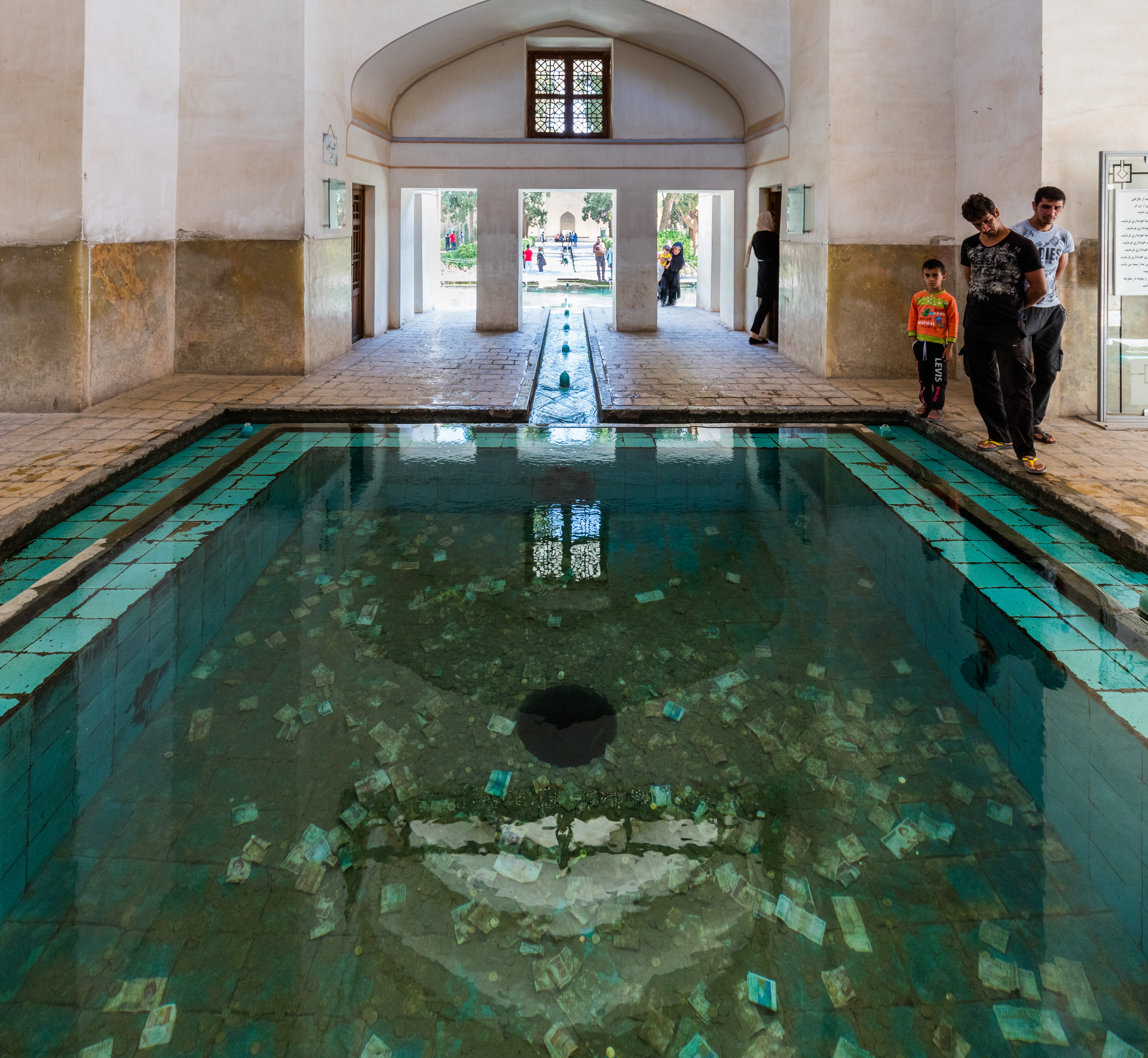
The Kushak is located in the central part of the garden.

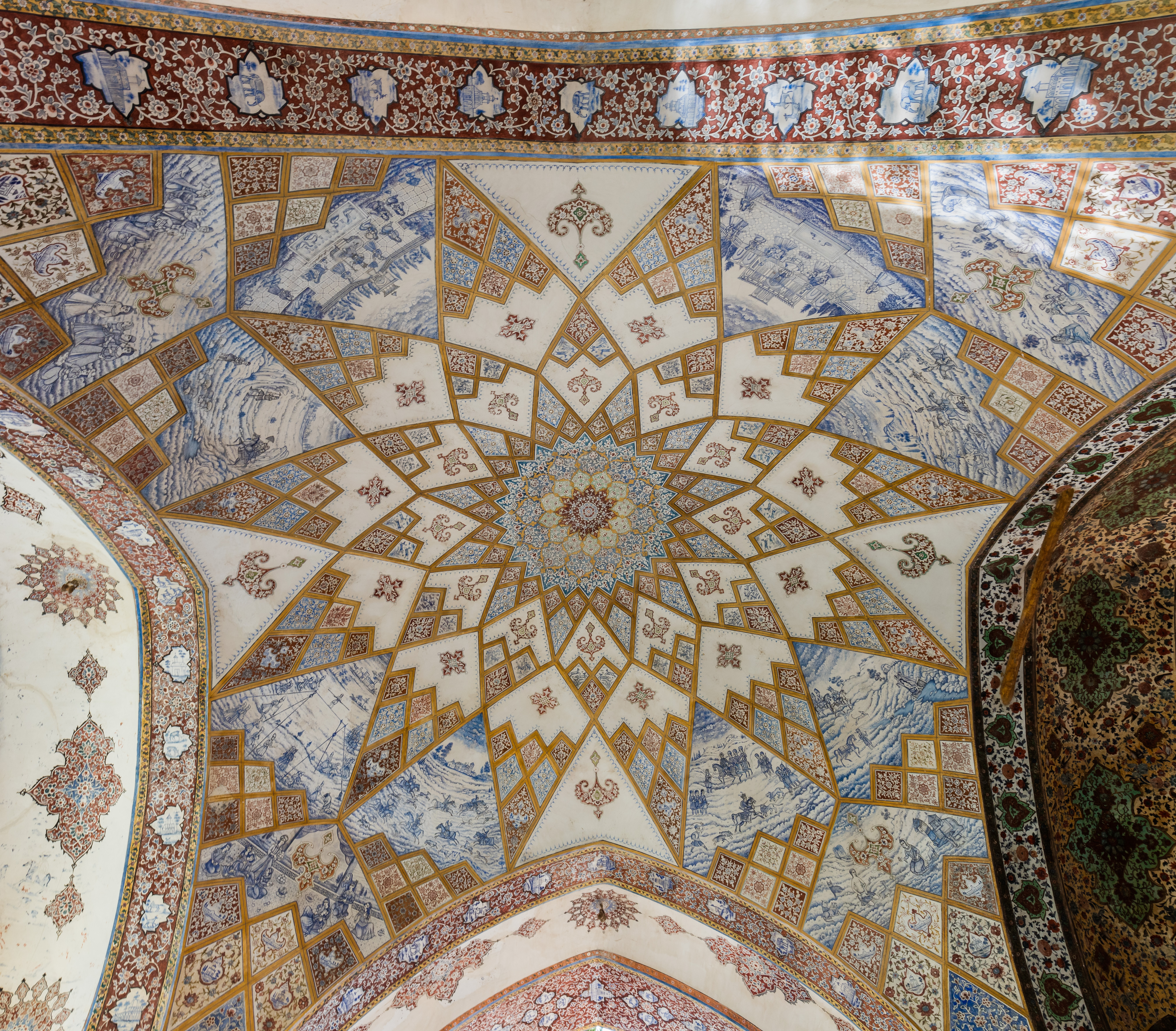
Detail of the ceiling of the Kushak.

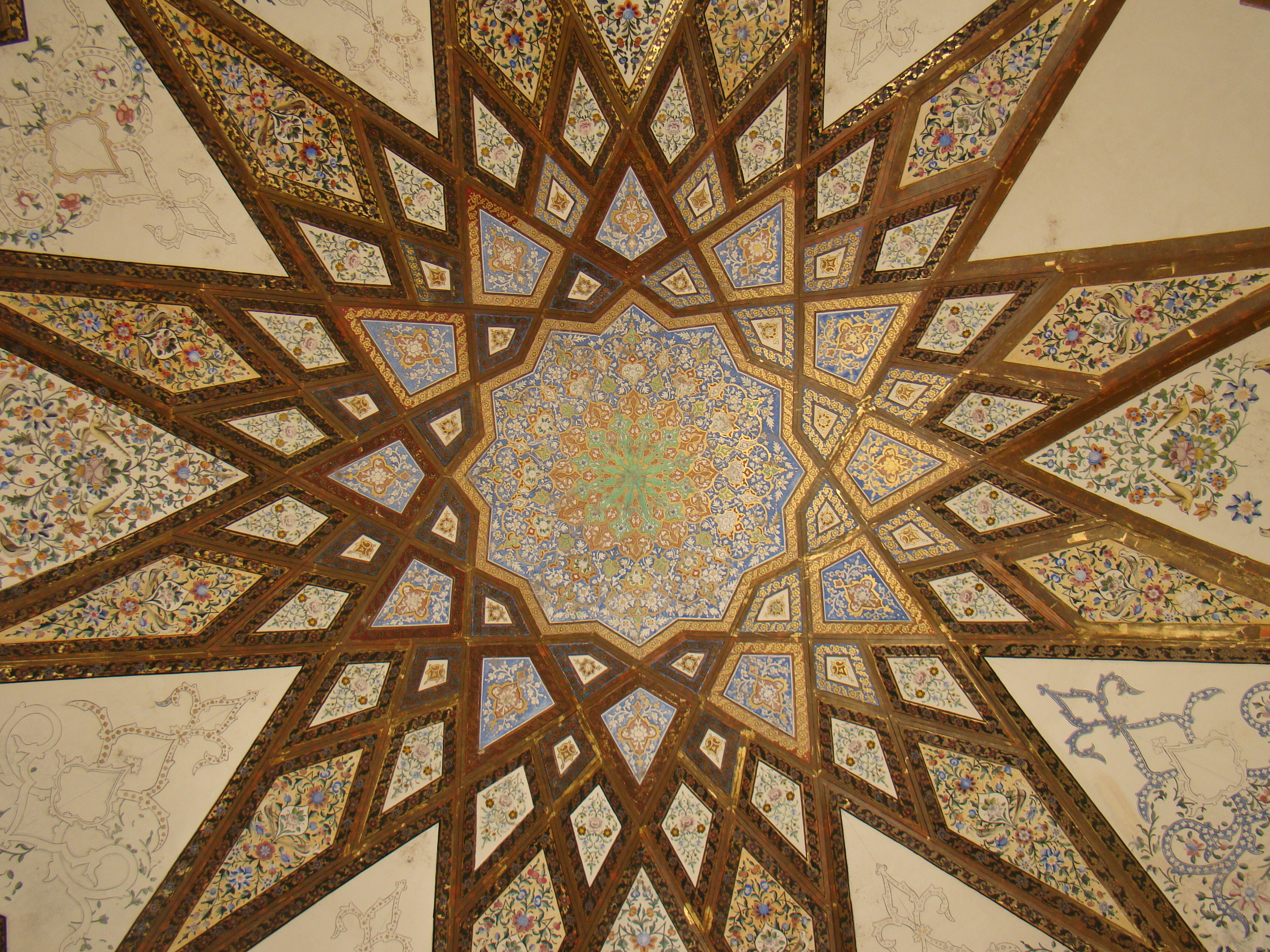

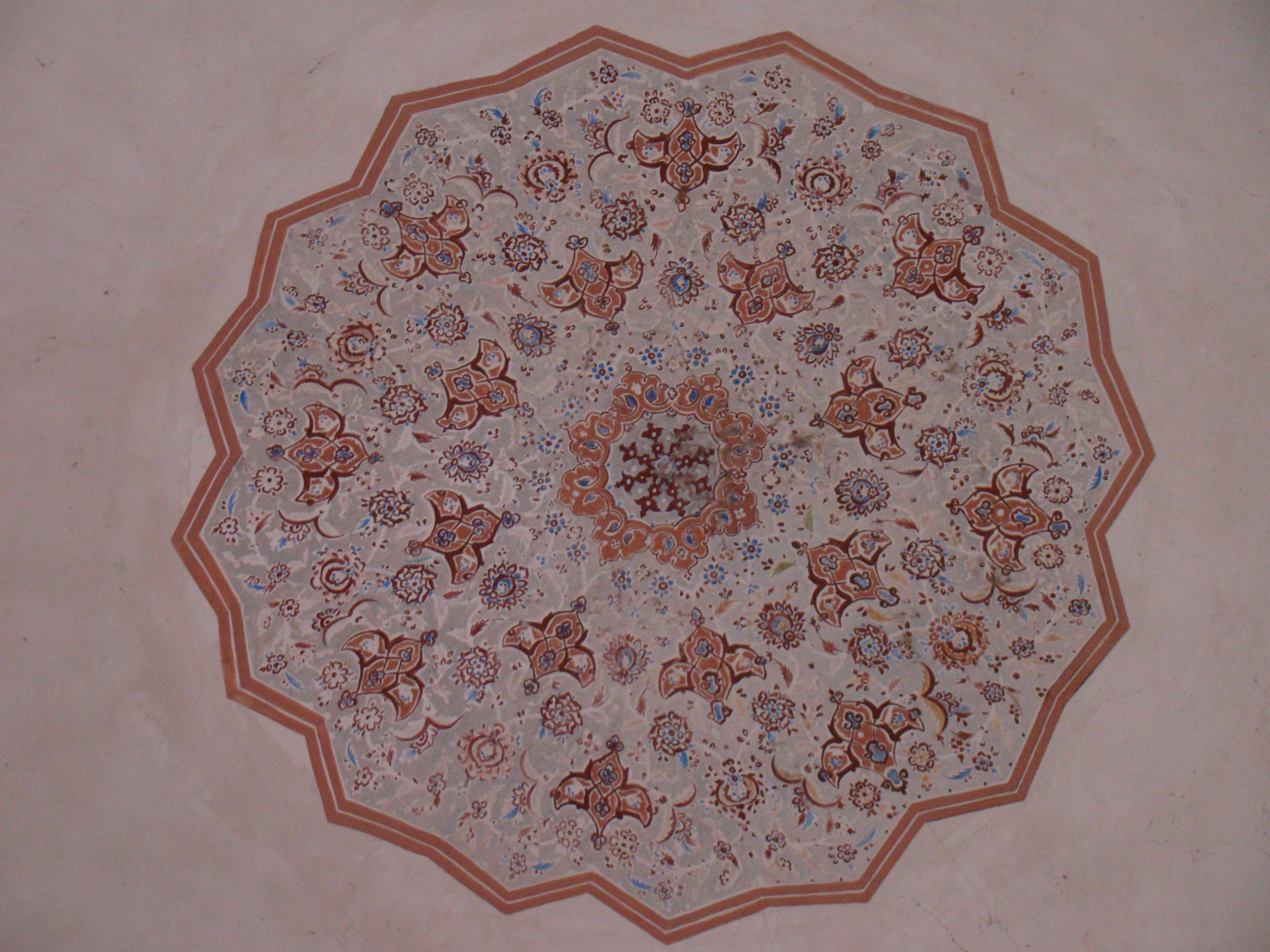

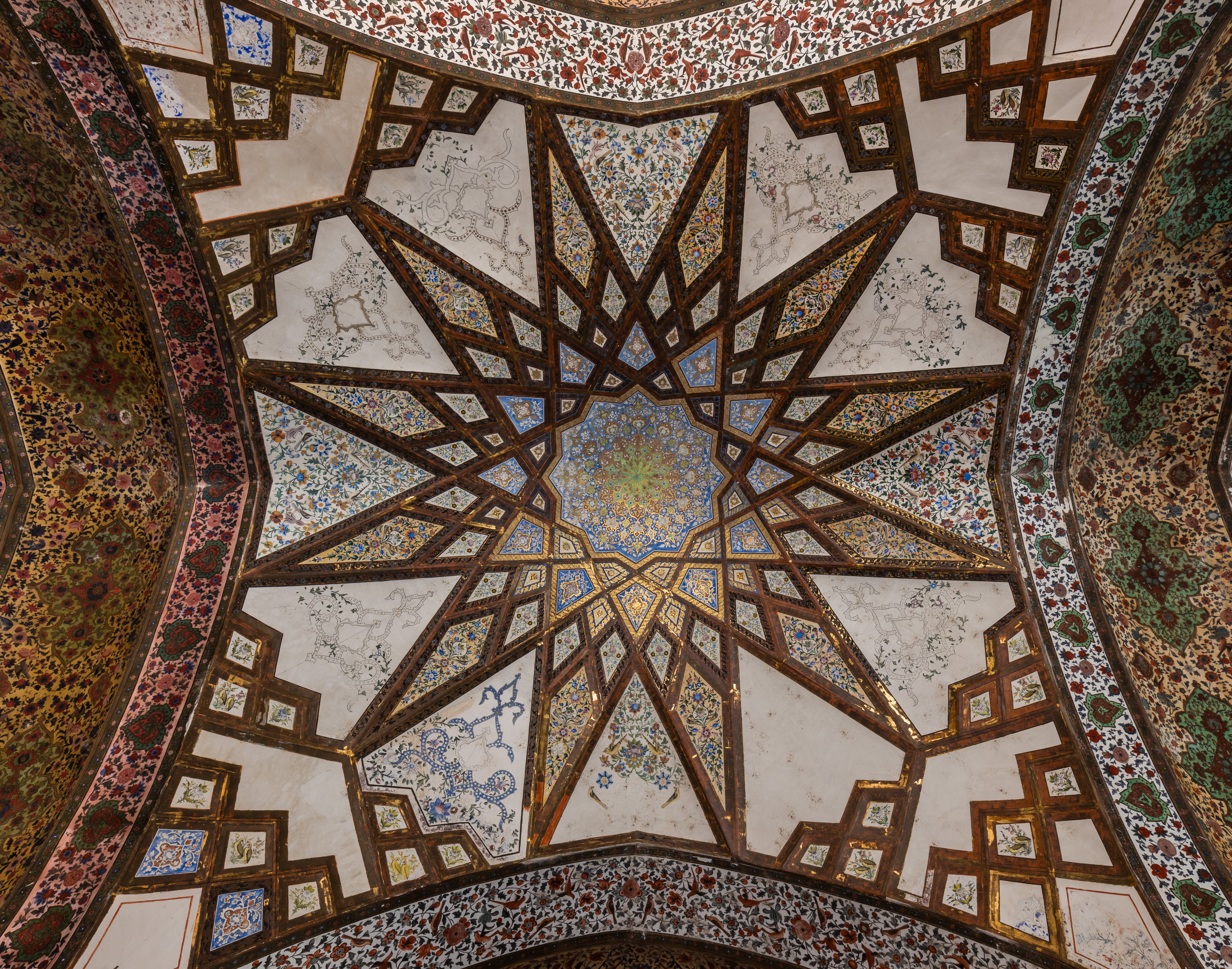

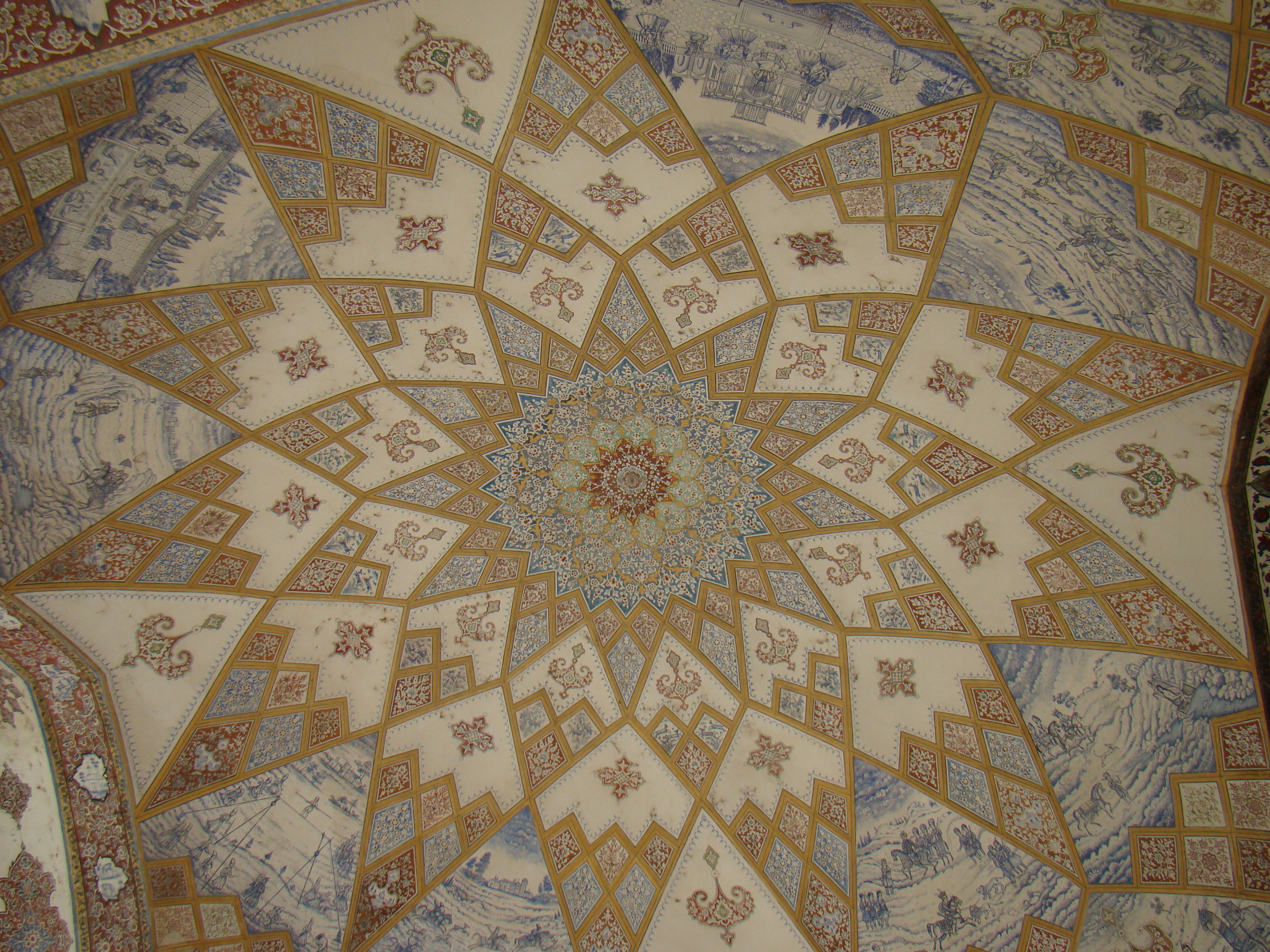

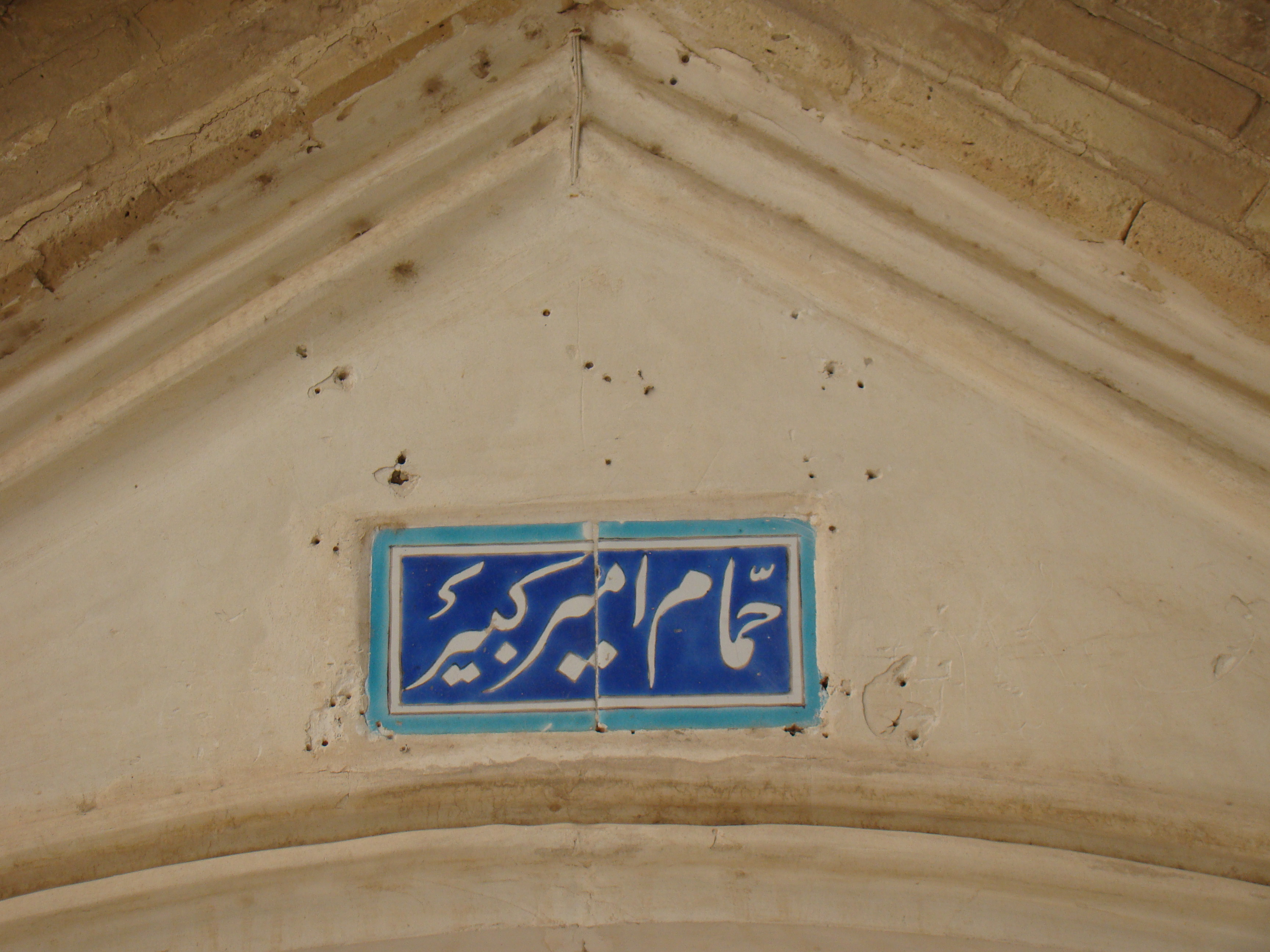

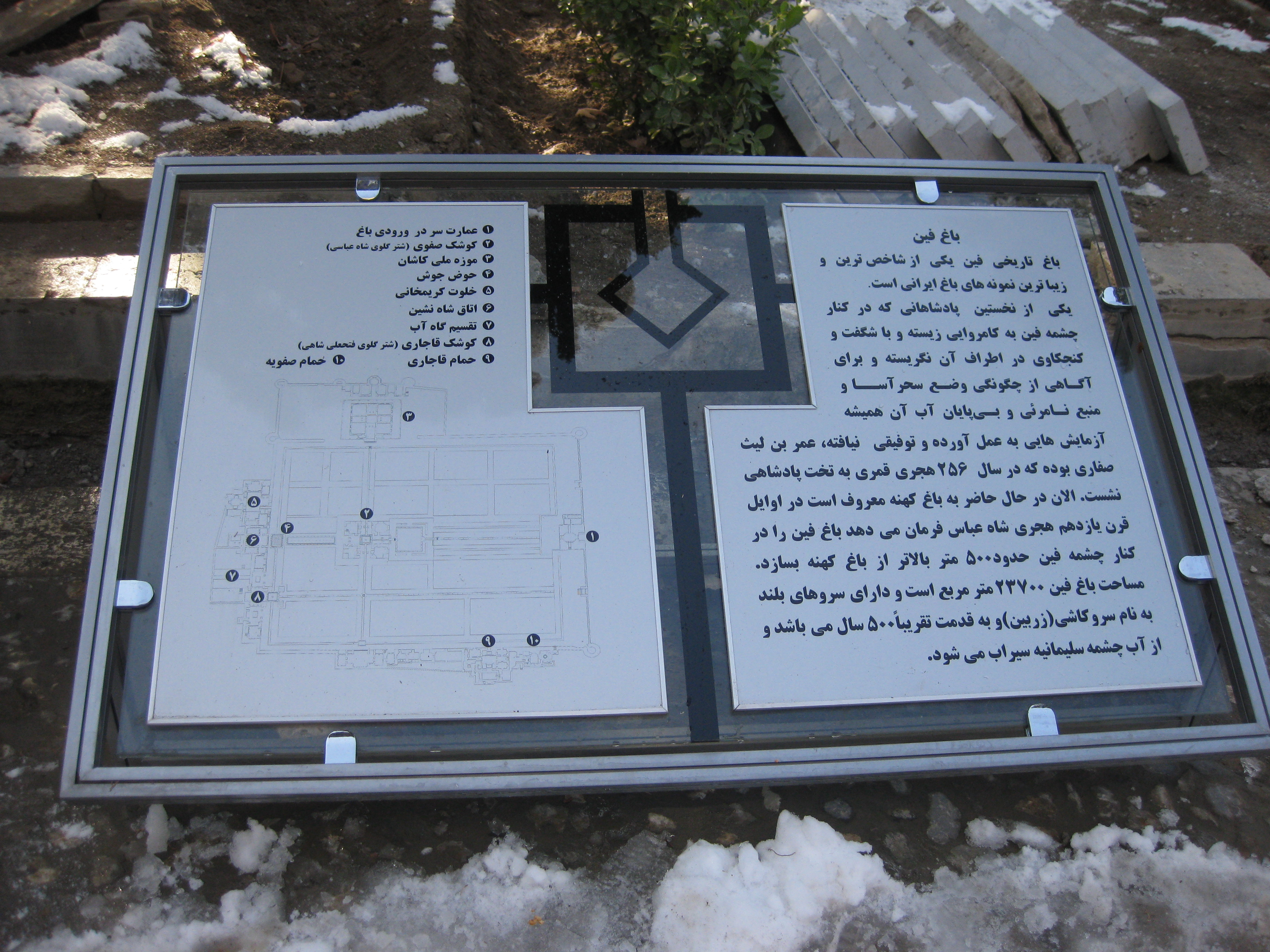

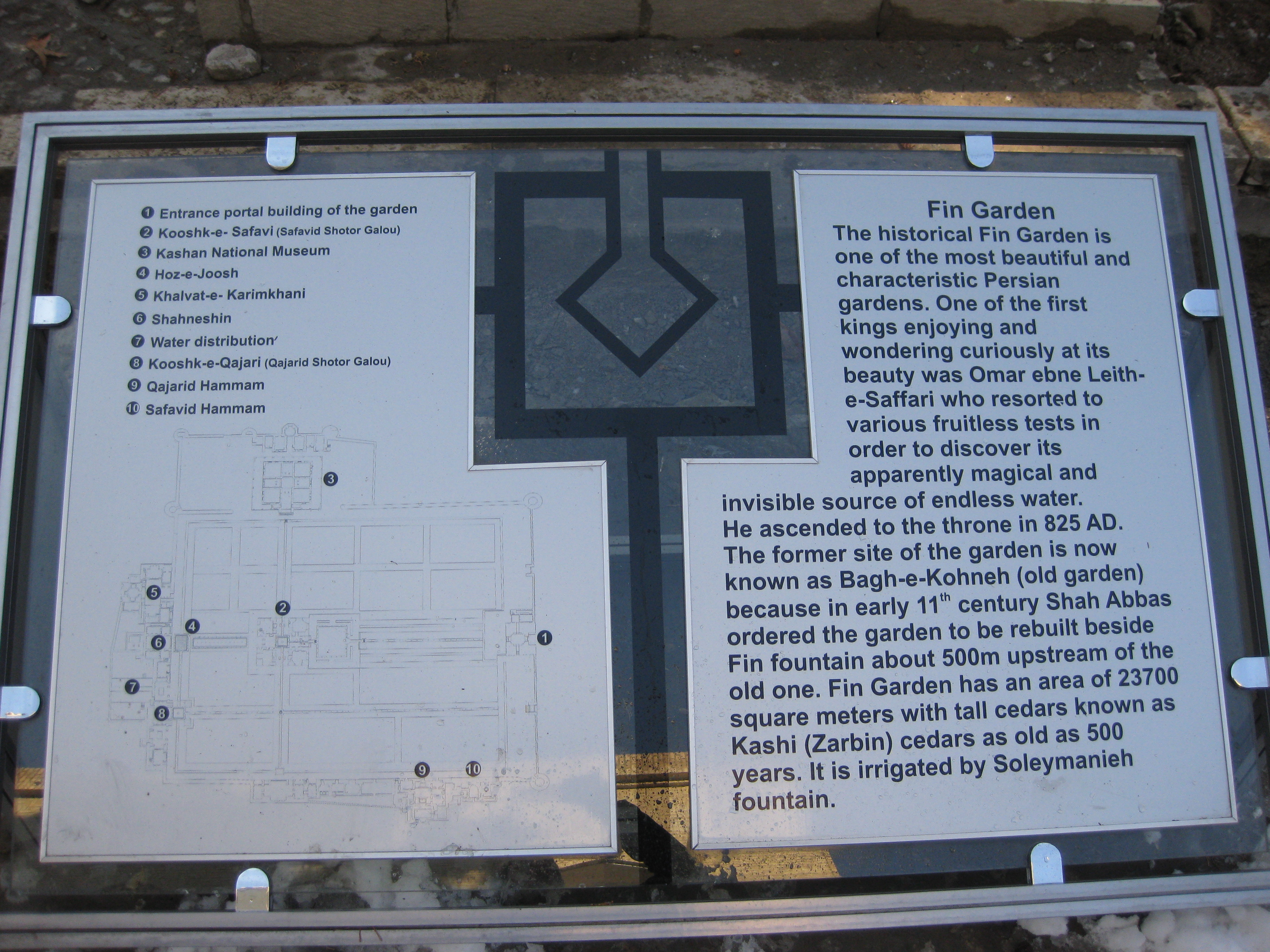

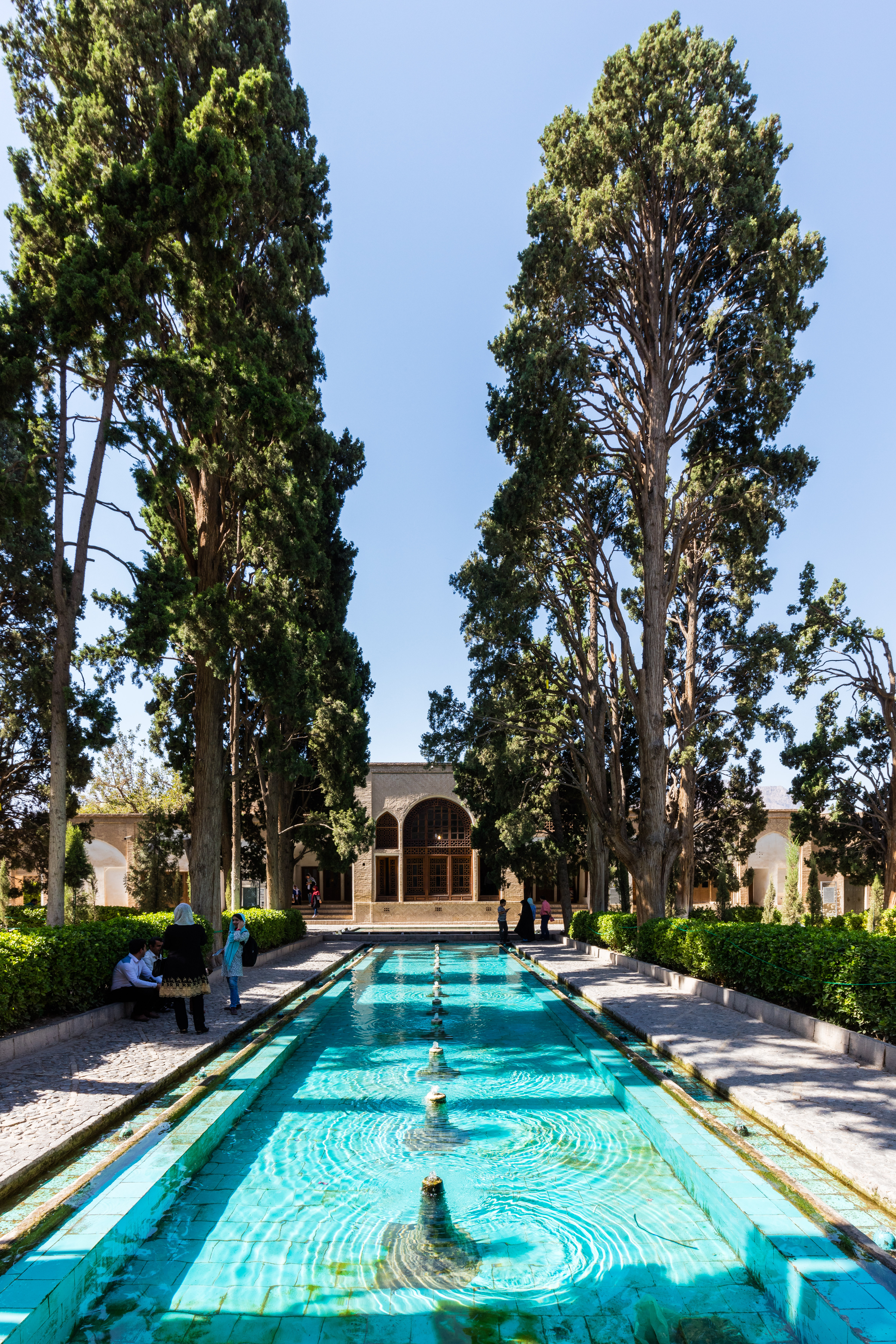
