= Mirza Ahmad Khan Saed ol-Molk =

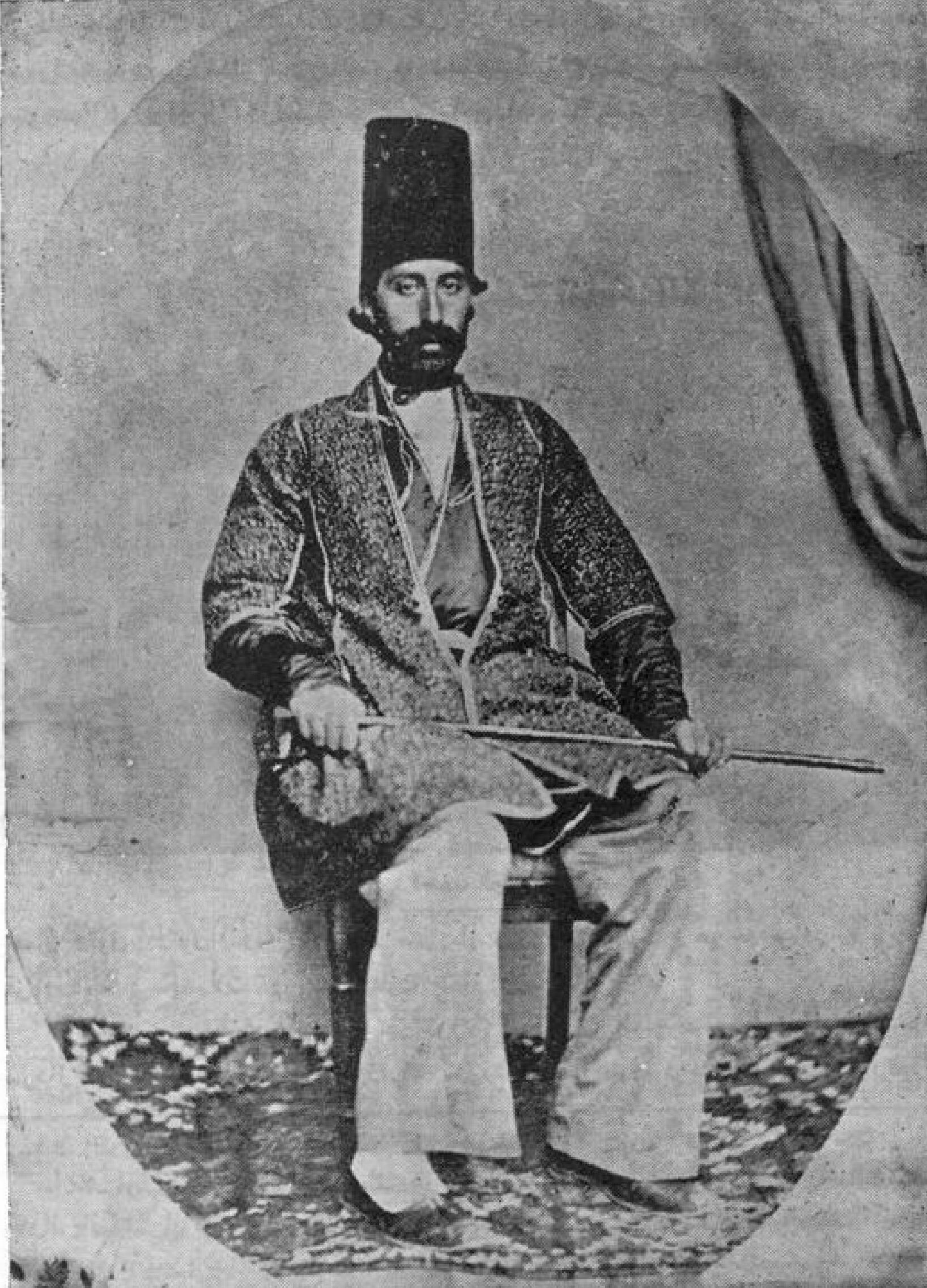
Photograph of Mirza Ahmad Khan Saed ol-Molk

Mirza Ahmad Khan Saed ol-Molk (Persian: میرزا احمد خان ساعدالملک; c. 1837/38–1863/69) was the only son that the prime minister Amir Kabir had with his first wife. Mirza Ahmad Khan was not given any official responsibilities throughout Amir Kabir's lifetime or following the latters murder in 1852.

After Mirza Aqa Khan Nuri was dismissed as the prime minister in 1858, Mirza Ahmad Khan was appointed as a brigadier general and a year later given the title of "Saed ol-Molk". Following the appointment of Aziz Khan Mokri as deputy to Crown Prince Mozaffar ad-Din Mirza in 1860/61, Mirza Ahmad Khan, being his brother-in-law, was named head of the army in the Azerbaijan province. Mirza Ahmad Khan died between 1863 and 1869, and was buried in the mausoleum of his father in the Imam Husayn Shrine in the city of Karbala.

== Sources ==
- Bamdad, Mehdi (1968). شرح حال رجال ایران در قرن ۱۲ و ۱۳ و ۱۴ هجری [Dictionary of National Biography of Iran, 1700-1960, vol. 1]. Tehran.
