= Amir Kabir =

Chancellor of Iran (1807–1852)

- میرزا تقی‌خان فراهانی
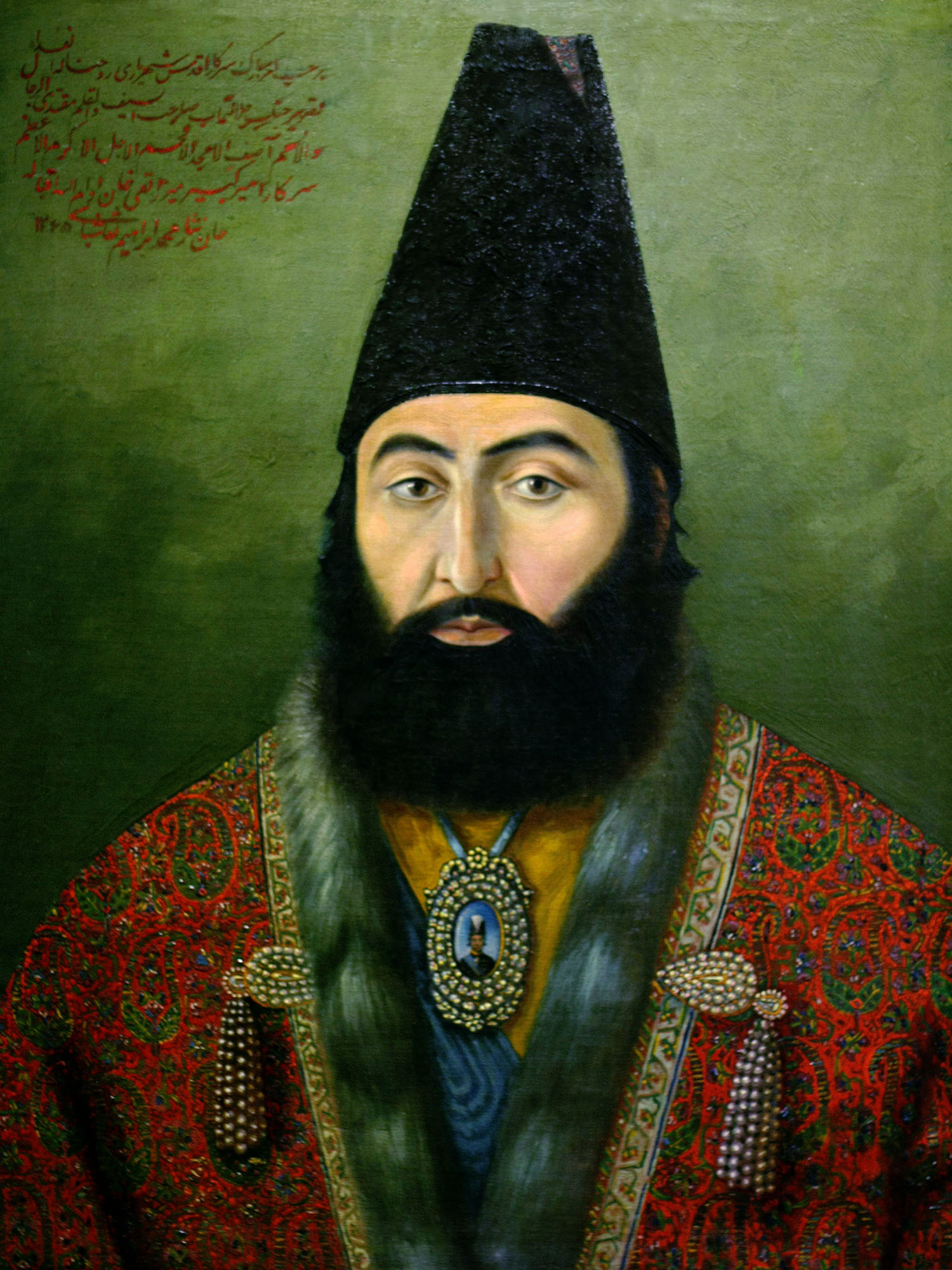

Prime Minister of Qajar Iran
- In office 12 May 1848 – 13 November 1851
- Monarch: Naser al-Din Shah Qajar
- Preceded by: Hajj Mirza Aghasi
- Succeeded by: Mirza Aqa Khan Nuri

Personal details
- Born: 9 January 1807 Hazaveh, Arak, Iran
- Died: 10 January 1852 (aged 45) Fin Garden, Kashan, Iran
- Cause of death: Assassination
- Party: Independent
- Spouses: Jan Jan Khanom (m. 1830; div. 1849); Ezzat ed-Dowleh (m. 1849; div. 1851)
- Children: 5, including Taj ol-Molouk, Mirza Ahmad Khan Saed ol-Molk and Hamdam al-Molouk
- Parent(s): Karbalayi Ghorban Ashpazbashi; Fatemeh Khanom

Mirza Taghi Khan-e Farahani (Persian: میرزا تقی‌خان فراهانی), better known as Amir Kabir (Persian: امیرکبیر; 9 January 1807 – 10 January 1852), (Note: Also known by the title of Amir-e Nezam or Amir Nezam (امیرنظام).) was chief minister to Naser al-Din Shah Qajar for the first three years of his reign. He is widely considered to be "Iran's first reformer", a moderniser who was "unjustly struck down" as he attempted to bring "gradual reform" to Iran.

Amir Kabir founded the first centre for higher education in Iran and the second Persian-language newspaper in the country. He prohibited bribery, torture of defendants and prisoners, and structured Iranian tax and financial system. As the prime minister, he also ordered suppression of Babism and the execution of the founder of the movement, the Báb. In the last years of his life he was exiled to Fin Garden in Kashan and was murdered by the command of Naser al-Din Shah on 10 January 1852.

== Background and achievements ==
=== Early career ===
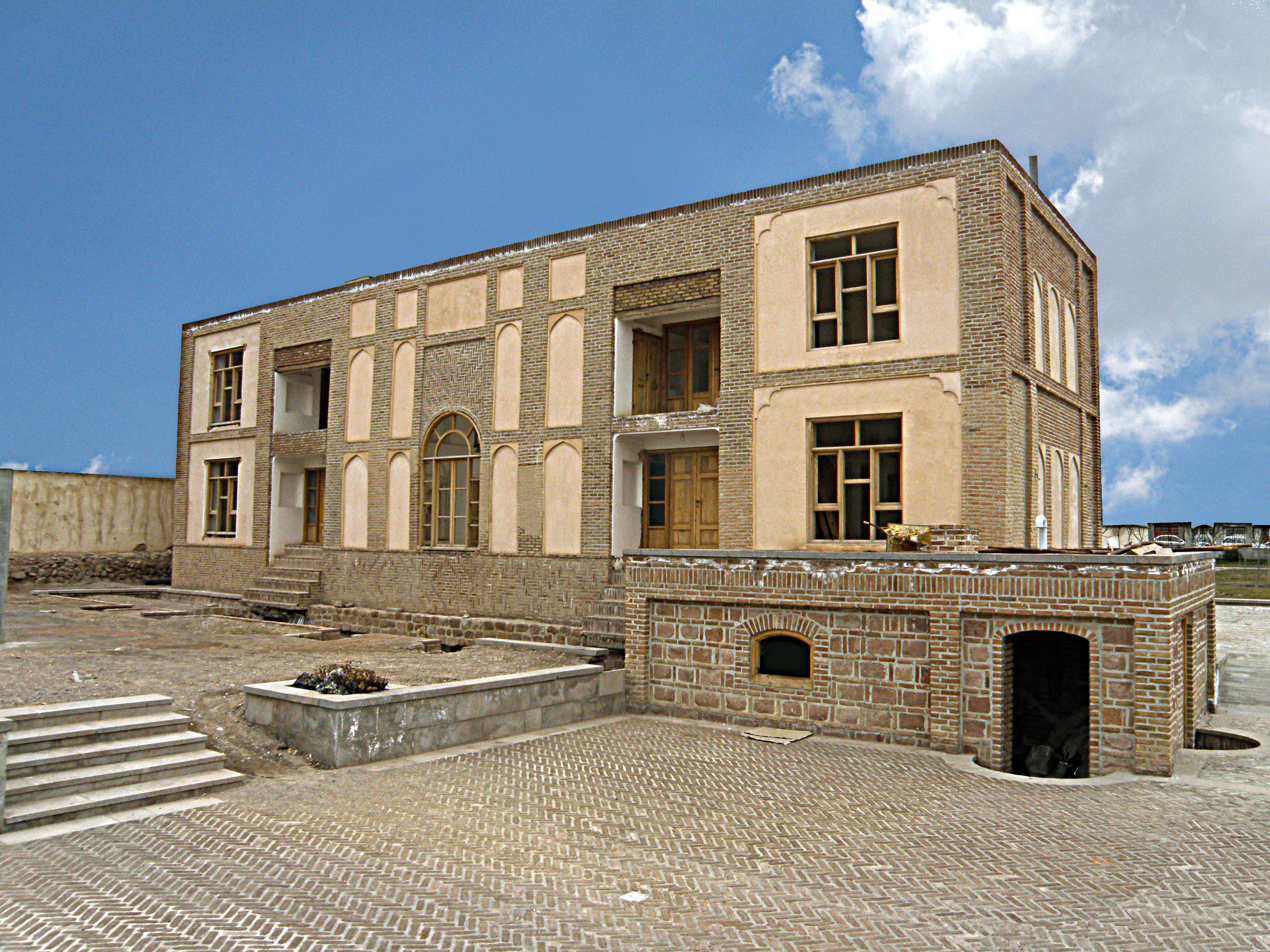
Amir Kabir's house in Tabriz

Amir Kabir was born in Hazaveh in the Arak district, in what is now Markazi Province of Iran. His father, Karbalaʾi Mohammad Qorban, entered the service of Mirza Bozorg Qa'em-Maqam of Farahan as cook, and when Mirza Bozorg was appointed chief minister to ʿAbbas Mirza, the crown prince, in Tabriz, Karbalaʾi Qorban accompanied him there, taking his son with him. Amir Kabir first assisted his father in performing domestic duties in the household of Mirza Bozorg, who saw signs of unusual talent in the boy and had him study with his own children. Mirza Bozorg died in 1237/1822 and was succeeded in the post of minister to the crown prince by his son, Mirza Bozorg. Under the son's aegis, Amir Kabir entered government service, being appointed first to the post of lashkarnevis [military registrar] for the army of Azerbaijan. In 1251/1835, he was promoted to the position of mostofi-ye nezam, becoming responsible for supervising the finances of the army of Azerbaijan; several years later he was put in charge of the same army’s provisions, financing, and organization with the title of vazir-e nezam.

During his tenure, Amir Kabir participated in many missions abroad. He spent almost four years in Erzurum, part of a commission to delineate the Ottoman-Iranian frontier. He resisted attempts to exclude Mohammareh (present-day Khorramshahr) from Iranian sovereignty and to make Iran pay compensation for its military incursions into the area of Solaymaniyeh. In this, he acted independently of the central government in Tehran, which not only failed to formulate a consistent policy vis-à-vis the Ottomans but also opposed most of Amir Kabir’s initiatives. Although a form of treaty was concluded between Iran and the Ottoman state, the borders had still not been delineated when the Crimean War erupted and the British and Russian mediators, now at war with one another, withdrew. Amir Kabir nonetheless acquired first-hand knowledge of the procedures of international diplomacy and of the aims and policies of Britain and Russia with respect to Iran. This helped him in the elaboration of his own distinct policies toward the two powers when he became chief minister.

Moreover, his years in Erzurum fell during the Ottoman military and administrative reforms known as the Tanzimat. Some awareness of these reached Amir Kabir in Erzurum and inspired in him at least one aspect of his policy as chief minister: the elimination of clerical influence upon affairs of state. When explaining to the British consul at Tabriz in 1265/1849 his own determination to make the authority of the state paramount, he said, “The Ottoman government was able to begin reviving its power only after breaking the power of the mullahs”.

=== Reforms of the army ===
Amir Kabir returned to Tabriz in 1263/1847. A year later, while retaining the post and title of vazir-e nezam, he was appointed lala-bashi or chief tutor to the crown prince Naser al-Din, who was still only fifteen years of age. Soon after, in Shawwal, 1264/September, 1848, Mohammad Shah died, and Naser al-Din had to proceed to Tehran and assume the throne. But his minister, Mirza Fathallah Nasir-al-molk ʿAliabadi, was unable to procure the necessary funds, so Naser al-Din had recourse to Amir Kabir, who made the necessary arrangements. Naser al-Din’s confidence in Amir Kabir increased, and shortly after leaving Tabriz, he awarded him the rank of amir-e nezam, with full responsibility for the whole Iranian army. After arriving in Tehran, he also appointed him chief minister (shakhs-e avval-e Iran), with the supplementary titles of amir-e kabir and atabak (Ḏu’l-qaʿda, 1264/October, 1848). The former title came to be his common designation; the latter, used for the first time since the Saljuk era, referred to the tutorial relationship between the minister and his young master.

His appointment as the chief minister aroused resentment, particularly the Queen Mother, Malek Jahan Khanom, and other princes, who resented Amir Kabir’s reduction of their spending and allowances. The intrigues of his opponents resulted in a mutiny of a company of Azerbaijani troops garrisoned in Tehran; but with the cooperation of Mirza Abu’l-Qasem Imam of Friday Prayer in Tehran, who ordered the merchants of Tehran to close the bazaar and arm themselves, the mutiny was soon quelled, and Amir Kabir resumed his duties.

More severe disorder prevailed in a number of provincial cities, especially Mashhad. Toward the end of the reign of Mohammad Shah, Hamza Mirza Heshmat-al-doleh was appointed governor of Khorasan, but he found his authority disputed by Hasan Khan Salar, who, with the help of some local chieftains, had rebelled against the central government (1262/1846). Hamza Mirza abandoned Mashad to Hasan Khan and fled to Herat. Amir Kabir sent two armies against Hasan Khan, the second of which, commanded by Soltan Morad Mirza, defeated his forces and captured him. Amir Kabir had him executed (1266/1850), together with one of his sons and one of his brothers, a punishment of unprecedented severity for such provincial resistance to central authority, and a clear sign of Amir Kabir’s intention to assert the prerogatives of the state.

=== Administrative reforms ===
With order reestablished in the provinces, Amir Kabir turned to a wide variety of administrative, cultural, and economic reforms that were the major achievement of his brief ministry. His most immediate success was the vaccination of Iranians against smallpox, saving the lives of many thousands if not millions. Faced with an empty treasury on his arrival in Tehran, he first set about balancing the state budget by attempting to increase the sources of revenue and to decrease state expenditure. To aid him in the task, he set up a budgetary committee headed by Mirza Yusof Mostofi al-Mamalek that estimated the deficiency in the budget at one million Iranian toman. Amir Kabir thereupon decided to reduce drastically the salaries of the civil service, often by half, and to eliminate a large number of stipends paid to pensioners who did little or no governmental work. This measure increased his unpopularity with many influential figures and thus contributed to his ultimate disgrace and death.

At the same time he strove to collect overdue taxes from provincial governors and tribal chieftains by dispatching assessors and collectors to every province of the country. The collection of customs duties, previously farmed out to individuals, was now made the direct responsibility of the central government, and the Caspian fisheries, an important source of revenue, were recovered from a Russian monopoly and contracted out to Iranians.

The administration of the royal lands (khalesajat) came under review, and the income derived from them was more closely supervised than before. Yield and productivity, not area, were established as the basis of tax assessment for other lands, and previously dead lands were brought under cultivation. These various measures for the encouragement of agriculture and industry also benefited the treasury by raising the level of national prosperity and hence taxability.

Of particular interest is the care shown by Amir Kabir for the economic development of Khuzestan (then known as ʿArabestan), identified by him as an area of strategic importance, given its location at the head of the Persian Gulf, and also of potential prosperity. He introduced the planting of sugarcane to the province, built the Naseri dam on the river Karkheh and a bridge at Shushtar, and laid plans for the development of Mohammara. He also took steps to promote the planting of American cotton near Tehran and Urmia.

=== Dar ol-Fonun and cultural achievements ===
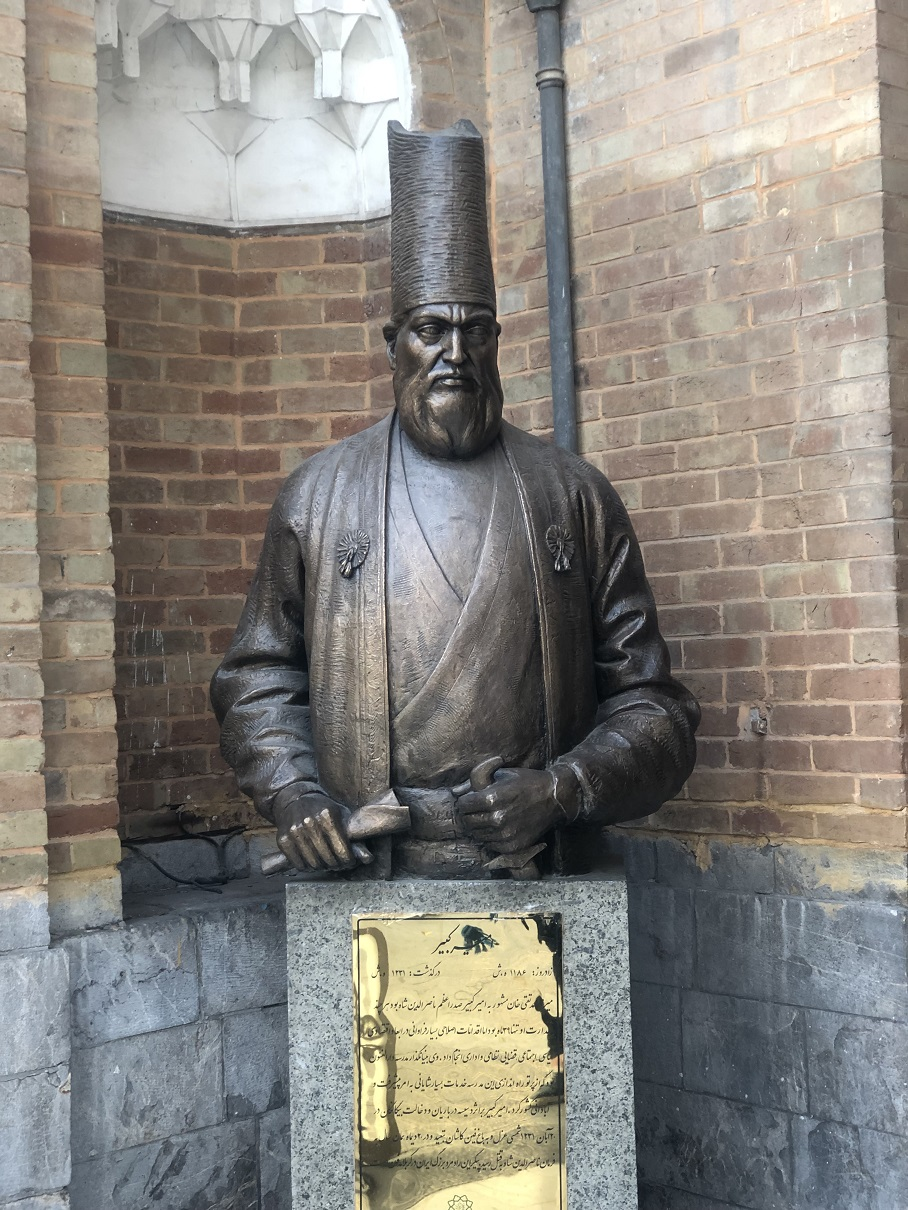
Statue of Amir Kabir in Dar ol-Fonun

Among the various measures enacted by Amir Kabir, the foundation of the Dar ol-Fonun, in Tehran was possibly the most lasting in its effects. Decades later, many parts of this establishment were turned into the University of Tehran, with the remaining becoming Dar ol-Fonun Secondary School. The initial purpose of the institution was to train officers and civil servants to pursue the regeneration of the state that Amir Kabir had begun, but as the first educational institution giving instruction in modern learning, it had far wider impact. Among the subjects taught were medicine, surgery, pharmacology, natural history, mathematics, geology, and natural science. The instructors were for the most part Austrians, recruited in Vienna by Daʾud Khan, an Assyrian who had become acquainted with Amir Kabir during the work of the Ottoman–Iranian border commission. By the time the instructors arrived in Tehran in Moharram, 1268/November, 1851, Amir Kabir had already been dismissed, and it fell to Daʾud Khan to receive them. The Austrian instructors initially knew no Persian, so interpreters had to be employed to assist in the teaching; but some among them soon learned Persian well enough to compose textbooks in the language on various natural sciences. These were to influence the evolution of a more simple and effective prose style in Persian than had previously existed. Dar ul-Funun had large fluctuations in its enrollment, primarily due to the Shah's fluctuating commitment in funding put into the institution. A clear decline in investment was apparent when a visitor reported in 1870 that seventy students and only a single European instructor were enrolled at the institution. Mirza Aqa Khan Nuri, Amir Kabir's successor, sought to persuade Naser-al-din Shah to abrogate the whole project, but the Dar ol-Fonun, soon became a posthumous monument to its founder.

Amir Kabir made a second indirect contribution to the elaboration of Persian as a modern medium with his foundation of the newspaper Vaqayeʿ-ye Ettefaqiyeh, which survived under different titles until the reign of Mozaffar al-Din Shah. A minimum circulation was ensured by requiring every official earning more than 2,000 rials a year to subscribe. In founding the journal Amir Kabir hoped to give greater effect to government decrees by bringing them to the attention of the public; thus the text of the decree forbidding the levying of soyursat was published in the third tissue of the paper. He also wished to educate its readers in the world’s political and scientific developments; among the items reported in the first year of publication were the struggles of Mazzini against the Habsburg Empire, the drawing up of the Suez Canal project, the invention of the balloon, a census of England, and the doings of cannibals in Borneo.

All of the measures enumerated so far had as their purpose the creation of a well-ordered and prosperous country, with undisputed authority exercised by the central government. This purpose was in part frustrated by the Ulema, who throughout the Qajar period disputed the legitimacy of the state and often sought to exercise an independent and rival authority. Amir Kabir took a variety of steps designed to curb their influence, above all in the sphere of law. He sought initially to supersede the sharʿ courts in the capital by sitting in judgment himself on cases brought before him; he abandoned the attempt when he realized that the inadequacy of his juridical knowledge had caused him to pronounce incorrect verdicts. Then he established indirect control over the sharʿ courts by giving prominence to one of them that enjoyed his special favor and by assigning the divan-khana, the highest instance of ʿorf jurisdiction, a more prominent role. All cases were to be referred to it before being passed on to a sharʿ court of the state’s choosing, and any verdict the sharʿ court then reached was valid only if endorsed by the divan-khaneh. In addition, any case involving a member of the non- Muslim minorities belonged exclusively to the jurisdiction of the divan-khana. Not content with thus circumscribing the prerogatives of the sharʿ courts, Amir Kabir took stringent measures against sharʿ judges found guilty of bribery or dishonesty; thus Molla ʿAbd-al-Rahim Borujerdi was expelled from Tehran when he offered to settle a case involving one of Amir Kabir's servants to the liking of the minister.

Amir Kabir also sought to reduce clerical power by restricting the ability of the ulema to grant refuge (bast), in their residences and mosques. In 1266/1850, bast was abolished, for example, at the Shah Mosque in Tehran, although it was restored after the downfall of Amir Kabir. In Tabriz, prolonged efforts were made to preserve bast at various mosques in the city, and recourse was even had to the alleged miracle of a cow that twice escaped the slaughterhouse by running into the shrine known as Boqʿa-ye Saheb-al-amr. The immediate instigators of the "miracle" were brought to Tehran, and soon after the emam-e jomʿa and shaykh-al-eslam of Tabriz, who had reduced civil government in the city to virtual impotence, were expelled. Less capable of fulfillment was Amir Kabir's desire to prohibit the ta'ziyeh, the Shia "passion play" enacted in Moharram, as well as the public self-flagellation that took place during the mourning season. He obtained the support of several ulema in his attempt to prohibit these rites, but was obliged to relent in the face of strong opposition, particularly from Isfahan and Azerbaijan.

=== Minorities ===
Amir Kabir took a largely benevolent interest in the non-Muslim minorities of Iran, though in order to further his desire of strengthening the state. In Erzurum he had learned how European powers intervened in Ottoman affairs on the pretext of "protecting" the Christian minorities, and there were indications that Britain, Russia, and France hoped for similar benefits from the Assyrians and Armenians of Iran. He moved therefore to remove any possible grievances and hence any need for a foreign "protector." He exempted the priests of all denominations from taxation, and gave material support to Christian schools in Azerbaijan and Isfahan. In addition, he established a close relationship with the Zoroastrians of Yazd, and gave strict orders to the governor of the city that they not be molested or subjected to arbitrary taxes. He also forbade attempts made in Shushtar to convert forcibly the Mandaean community to Islam.

=== Foreign policy ===
The foreign policy of Amir Kabir was as innovative as his internal policies. He has been credited with pioneering the policy of "negative equilibrium," (giving concessions to neither Britain nor Russia) that was to later prove influential in Iranian foreign affairs. He thus abrogated the agreement whereby the Russians were to operate a trade center and hospital in Astarabad, and attempted to put an end to the Russian occupation of Ashuradeh, an island in the southeastern corner of the Caspian Sea, as well as the anchorage rights enjoyed by Russian ships in the lagoon of Anzali.

In the south of Iran he made similar efforts to restrict British influence in the Persian Gulf, and denied Britain the right to stop Iranian ships in the Persian Gulf on the pretext of looking for slaves. It is not surprising that he frequently clashed with Dolgorukiy and Sheil, the representatives of Russia and Britain in Tehran. In order to counteract British and Russian influence, he sought to establish relations with powers without direct interests in Iran, notably Austria and the United States. It may finally be noted that he set up a counter-espionage organization that had agents in the Russian and British embassies.

== Suppression of Bábís and execution of the Báb ==
Amir Kabir regarded the followers of Bábism, the predecessor of the Baháʼí Faith, as a threat and repressed them. He suppressed the Babi upheavals of 1848–51 and personally ordered the execution of the Seven Martyrs of Tehran and the execution of The Báb, the movement's founder. ʻAbdu'l-Bahá referred to Amir Kabir as the greatest of the religion's oppressors but also acknowledged his significant government reforms.

The challenging and heterodox nature of the Báb's claims provoked opposition on the part of the Shiʿite establishment, which then led the civil authorities of Qajar Iran to intervene on the side of the clerics. Although no Bábis are known to have been put to death for their faith during the first three-and-a-half years of the movement and during the reign of Mohammad Shah (May 1844–late 1847), several leading Bábi were persecuted for their activities; e.g. Mullá ʻAlíy-i-Bastámí, one of the early disciples of the Bab was arrested and put on trial in Ottoman Iraq in January 1845, and condemned to work in the naval dockyards in Istanbul where he soon died.

In 1848, however, after the death of Mohammad Shah, and enthronement of the new teenage king, Naser al-Din Shah and premiership of Amir Kabir, circumstances changed and a number of confrontations occurred between the Bábís and government and clerical establishment which led to the massacre of several thousand Bábís.

The first major killings of Bábís recorded in history took place in Qazvin. Since then, attacks against the Bábís by prominent clerics and their followers became more common and some Bábís started to carry arms. In remote and isolated places the scattered Bábís were readily attacked and killed while in places where large numbers of them resided they acted in self-defense. One of these attacks occurred in Babol of Mazandaran, where a group of Bábís under the leadership of Mullá Husayn Bushrui were passing through. A mob led by a local cleric attacked them and a fighting broke out between the two groups. The Bábís took refuge in the nearby shrine of Shaykh Tabarsi. Accused of rebellion by their opponents, they were subsequently attacked by various local and national forces. After seven months of siege and severely weakened by starvation and their own loss of men, they responded to sworn promises of a truce and were for the most part massacred. After that, two other big clashes between the Bábís and their opponents took place in the cities of Zanjan and Neyriz in the north and south of Iran, respectively, as well as a smaller conflict in Yazd. A total of several thousand Bábís were killed in these conflicts. In the three main conflicts in Ṭabarsí, Zanjan and Neyriz, Bábís were accused by their enemies of revolting against the government. However, in all three cases, the battles that took place were of a defensive nature, and not considered an offensive jihad, as the Báb did not allow it and in the case of two urban conflicts (Neyriz and Zanjan), they were related to pre-existing social and political tensions within the towns.

After the Ṭabarsi conflict, mere adherence to the Báb could be sufficient to lead to a death sentence. One famous example of that is when Amir Kabir personally ordered the public beheading of seven prominent Babis of high social rank, (three merchants, two clerics, a leading dervish and a government official) in February 1850. The seven could easily have saved their lives by recanting their faith, but they refused.

In mid-1850, Amir Kabir ordered the execution of the Báb which was followed by the killings of many other Bábís. The Báb stood his ground despite great pressure to recant, and gain his freedom. Consequently he was executed by a firing squad in public in Tabriz, the first execution of its kind in Iran, to crush the Babi movement and to display the restored power of the Qajar government under the new minister, Amir Kabir.

The confrontation between Amir Kabir and the Bábís was between two visions of modernity. Amir Kabir envisaged state-enforced reforms that were authoritarian and secular while the Bábís advocated an all-embracing religious renewal, proposed by the Báb, that emphasized, among other teachings, progressive revelation, abolishing priesthood, independent investigation of religious matters without the need for the clergy, and improving the status of women.

The Babis were advocating a grass-roots revolution to reform religious doctrine and remedy the ills of the clerical class and those of the community as a whole. Amir Kabir, on the other, sought to eliminate all expressions of religious dissent while trying unsuccessfully to subordinate the clerical class to the authority of the state. The European-inspired secularism of Amir Kabir was antithetical to serious reconsideration of religious tenets; especially if they could disturb security and order. By denying the Babis a chance to survive as a viable alternative, the Qajar state reaffirmed the unrivaled status of the clergy as the sole arbiter of religious norms. With the suppression of the Bábi movement chances for an indigenous movement of change ceased to exist for decades to come, and Amir Kabir inadvertently cleared the way for the consolidation of the power of the clergy for the rest of the century and beyond.

== Dismissal and execution ==
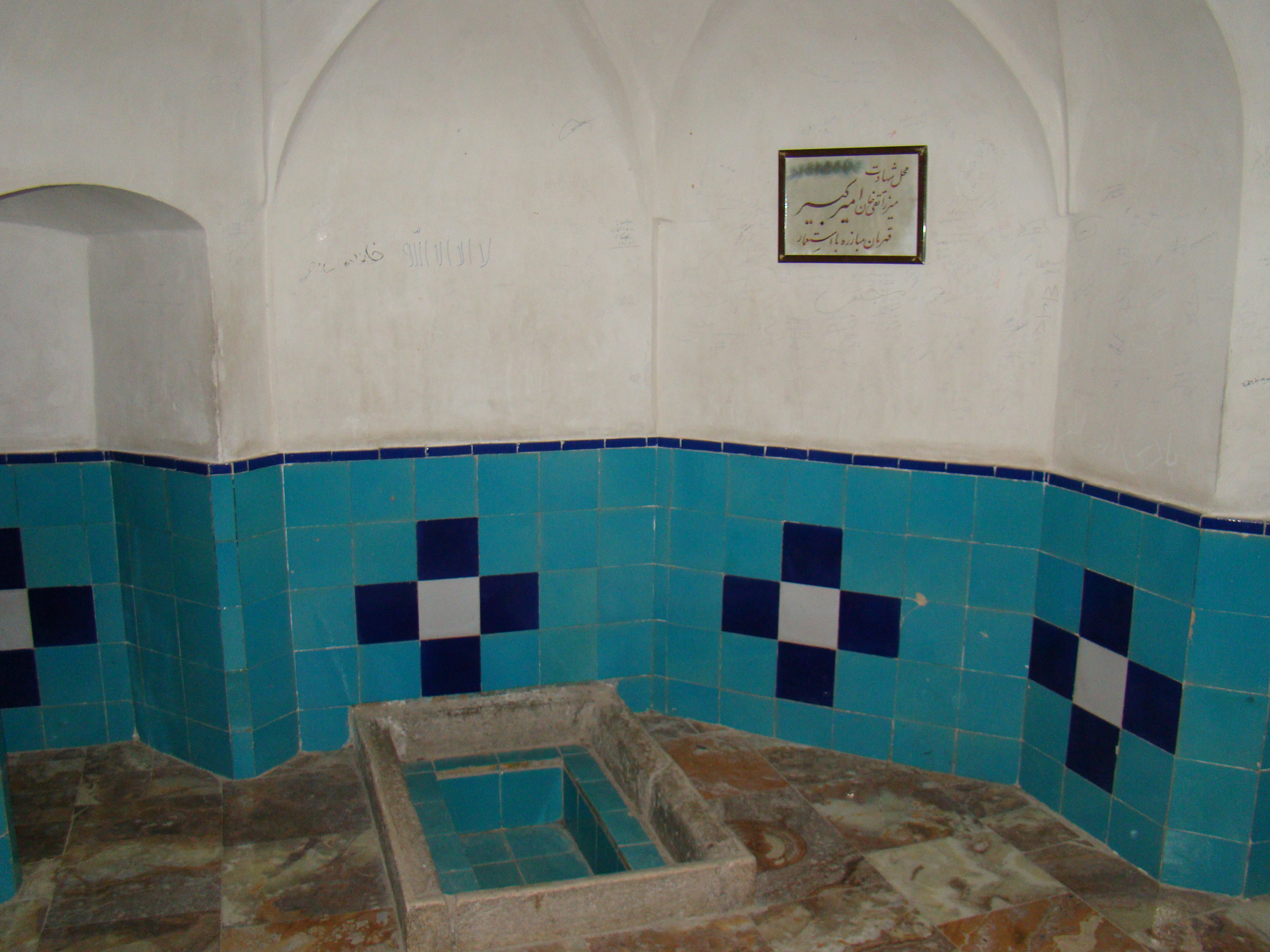
Amir Kabir's murder site in Fin Garden

From the start, Amir Kabir's policies incited animosity within the influential circles of Iranian elite – most notably the inner circle of the monarchy whose pensions and income were slashed by his financial reforms. He was also later opposed by those who envied him his numerous posts; they were backed strongly by foreign powers, whose influence had greatly diminished under his leadership. A coalition was thus formed among this opposition whose prominent members consisted of the Queen Mother, Mirza Aqa Khan Nuri (Amir Kabir’s lieutenant, reputedly Anglophile), and Mirza Yusuf Khan Ashtiyani (the Court's chief accountant, reputedly Russophile).

As the adolescent Naser al-Din Shah began to exert his own independence in government, he was strongly influenced by the Queen Mother. Through her influence, Amir Kabir was demoted solely to the chief of the army and replaced by Nuri as the premier. This transition marked a rejection "of … reformist measures in favor of the traditional practices of government." The power struggle in government finally resulted in his arrest and expulsion from the capital under continued Russian and British interference. Amir Kabir was sent to Kashan under duress and kept in isolation by the Shah's decree. His execution was ordered six weeks later after the Queen Mother and his executioner, Ali Khan Farash-bashi, had convinced the King that Amir Kabir would soon be granted protection by the Russians – possibly allowing him to make an attempt to regain control of the government by force. The young Shah may have been inclined to believe these accusations because of the arrogance and disdain for protocol that Amir Kabir had shown since the beginning of his government career in Tabriz. Amir Kabir was murdered in Kashan on 10 January 1852. With him, many believe, died the prospect of an independent Iran led by meritocracy rather than nepotism.

== Legacy ==
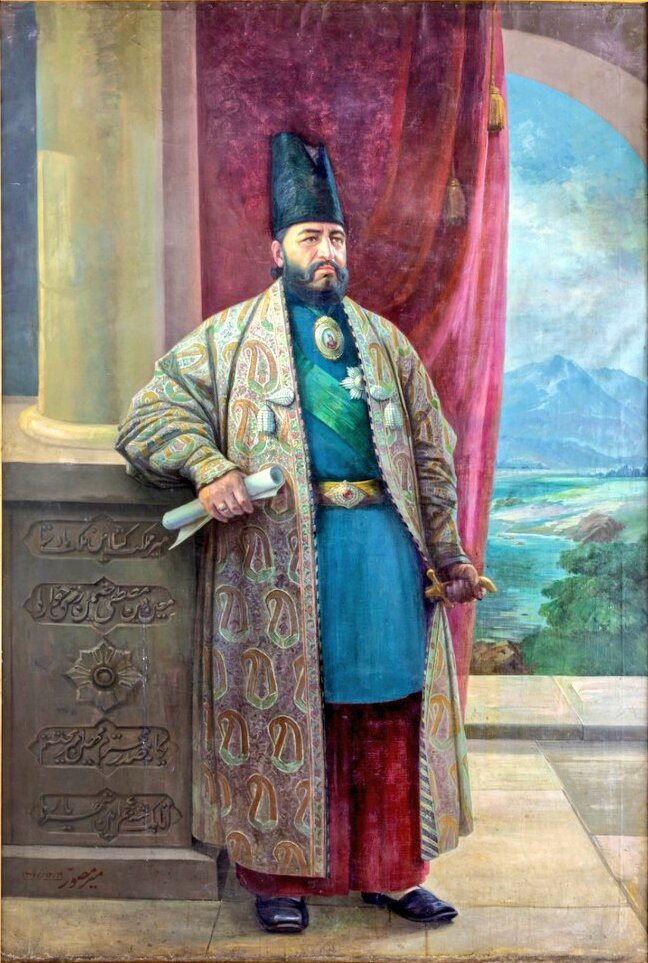
Portrait of Amir Kabir by Mir Hossein Arjangi, 1949

Among his Iranian contemporaries Amir Kabir received praise from several poets of the age, notably Sorush and Qaʾani, but his services to Iran remained generally unappreciated during the Qajar era. Modern Iranian historiography has done him more justice, depicting him as one of the few capable and honest statesmen to emerge during the Qajar era and the progenitor of various political and social changes that came about half a century later:

- Amir Kabir Dam, inaugurated in 1961, is named after him.
- Tehran Polytechnic, established in 1958, was renamed Amirkabir University of Technology after him in 1979.
- Amirkabir, a well-known publisher founded in 1949.

== Fictional depictions ==
- Amir Kabir Farahani is portrayed by actor Dariush Arjmand in Mohsen Makhmalbaf's movie Nasereddin Shah, Actor-e Cinema.
- He is also portrayed by Saeed Nikpour in the Iranian television series Amir Kabir.
- He is also portrayed by Naser Malek Motiei in Iranian television series Soltan-e Sahebgharan.
- He is a character in the 1990 novel Phantom by Susan Kay which explores the life of the titular character of Gaston Leroux's novel The Phantom of the Opera. His exile and death are depicted in the novel.

== See also ==
- List of prime ministers of Iran
- Military history of Iran
- Prime Minister of Iran
- Dapir
