= God in Abrahamic religions =

In Abrahamic religions, God refers to the supreme and only deity. Monotheism—the belief that there is only one deity—is a foundational tenet of the Abrahamic religions, which each conceive God as the all-powerful and all-knowing deity from whom Abraham received a divine revelation, according to their respective narratives. The most prominent Abrahamic religions are Judaism, Christianity, and Islam. They—alongside Samaritanism, the Druze faith, the Baháʼí Faith, and the Rastafari movement—all share a common belief in the God of Abraham. Likewise, the Abrahamic religions share similar features distinguishing them from other categories of religions:

- all of their theological traditions are, to some extent, influenced by the depiction of the God of Israel in the Hebrew Bible, who is explicitly named YHWH in Hebrew and referred to as Allah in Arabic;
- all of them trace their roots to Abraham as a common genealogical or spiritual patriarch.

The Abrahamic God is one, eternal, omnipotent, omniscient, and the creator of the universe. God is typically referred to with masculine grammatical articles and pronouns only, and is further held to have the properties of holiness, justice, omnibenevolence, and omnipresence. Adherents of the Abrahamic religions believe God is also transcendent, meaning he is outside of both space and time and therefore not subject to anything within his creation, but at the same time a personal God: intimately involved, listening to individual prayer, and reacting to the actions of his creatures.

== Judaism ==
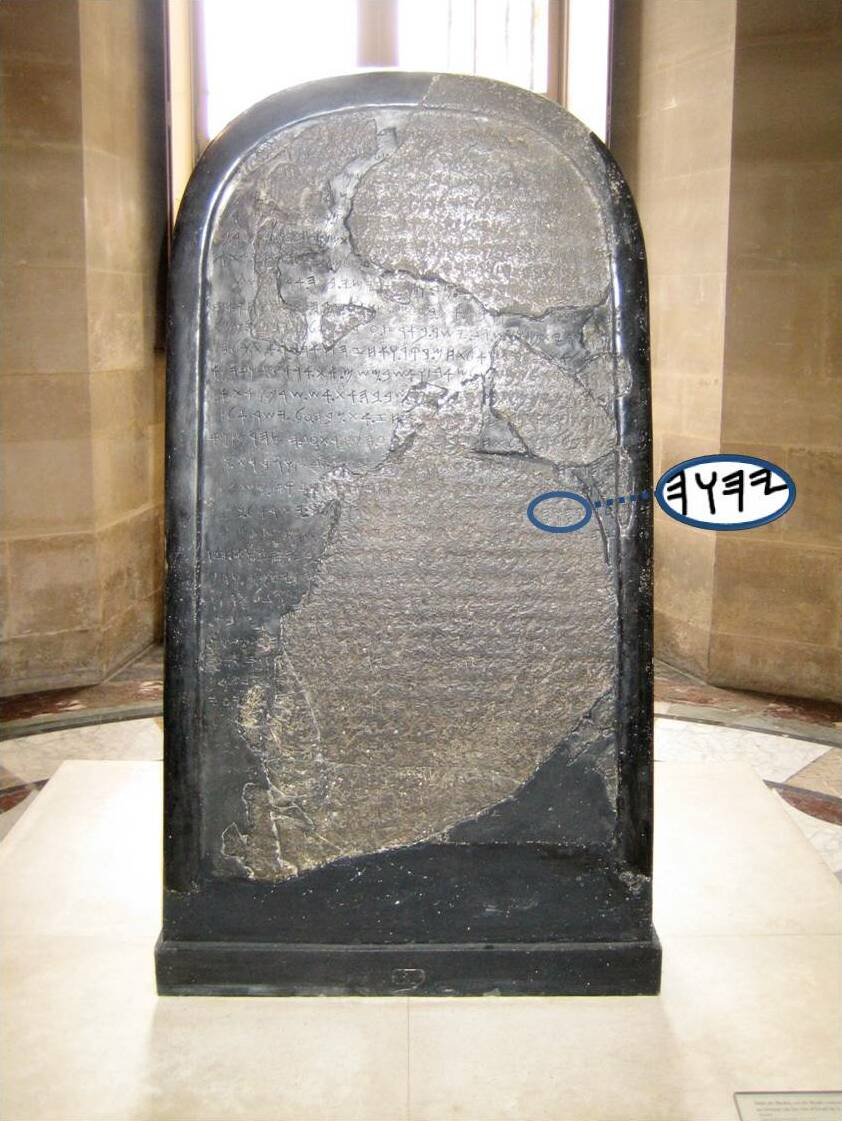
The Mesha Stele bears the earliest known reference (840 BCE) to the Israelite god Yahweh.

Judaism, the oldest Abrahamic religion, is based on a strictly exclusive monotheism, finding its origins in the sole veneration of Yahweh, the predecessor to the Abrahamic conception of God. (Note: Although the Semitic god El is indeed the most ancient predecessor to the Abrahamic god, this specifically refers to the ancient ideas Yahweh once encompassed in the Ancient Hebrew religion, such as being a storm- and war-god, living on mountains, or controlling the weather. Thus, in this article's context, "Yahweh" is used to refer to God as conceived in the Ancient Hebrew religion, and should not be referenced when describing his later worship in today's Abrahamic religions.) The names of God used most often in the Hebrew Bible are the Tetragrammaton (Hebrew: יהוה, romanized: YHWH) and Elohim. Jews traditionally do not pronounce it, and instead refer to God as HaShem, literally "the Name". In prayer, the Tetragrammaton is substituted with the pronunciation Adonai, meaning "My Lord". The Shema prayer is commonly translated as: "Hear O Israel: the LORD is our God, the LORD is One" (Deuteronomy 6:4).

God is conceived as unique and perfect, free from all faults, deficiencies, and defects, and further held to be omnipotent, omnipresent, omniscient, and completely infinite in all of his attributes, who has no partner or equal, being the sole creator of everything in existence. In Judaism, God is never portrayed in any image. The idea of God as a duality or trinity is heretical in Judaism: it is considered akin to polytheism. The Torah specifically forbade ascribing partners to share his singular sovereignty, as he is considered to be the absolute one without a second, indivisible, and incomparable being, who is similar to nothing and nothing is comparable to him. Thus, God is unlike anything in or of the world as to be beyond all forms of human thought and expression.

God in Judaism is conceived as anthropomorphic, unique, benevolent, eternal, the creator of the universe, and the ultimate source of morality. Thus, the term God corresponds to an actual ontological reality, and is not merely a projection of the human psyche. Traditional interpretations of Judaism generally emphasize that God is personal yet also transcendent and able to intervene in the world, while some modern interpretations of Judaism emphasize that God is an impersonal force or ideal rather than a supernatural being concerned with the universe.

== Christianity ==
Christianity originated in 1st-century Judea from a sect of apocalyptic Jewish Christians within the realm of Second Temple Judaism, and thus shares most of its beliefs about God, including his omnipotence, omniscience, his role as creator of all things, his personality, immanence, transcendence, and ultimate unity, with the innovation that Jesus of Nazareth is considered to be, in one way or another, the fulfillment of the ancient biblical prophecies about the Jewish Messiah, the completion of the Mosaic Law of the Israelite prophets and priests, the Son of God, and/or the incarnation of God himself as a human being.

Most Christian denominations believe Jesus to be the incarnated Son of God, which is the main theological divergence with respect to the exclusive monotheism of the other Abrahamic religions: Judaism, Samaritanism, Islam, the Druze faith, and the Baháʼí Faith. Although personal salvation is implicitly stated in Judaism, personal salvation by grace and a recurring emphasis in orthodox theological beliefs is particularly emphasized in Christianity, often contrasting this with a perceived over-emphasis in law observance as stated in Jewish law, where it is contended that a belief in an intermediary between man and God or in the multiplicity of persons in the Godhead is against the Noahide laws, and thus not monotheistic.

In mainstream Christianity, theology and beliefs about God are enshrined in the doctrine of monotheistic Trinitarianism, which holds that the three persons of the trinity are distinct but all of the same indivisible essence, meaning that the Father is God, the Holy Spirit is God, and the Son is God, yet there is one God as there is one indivisible essence. These mainstream Christian doctrines were largely formulated at the Council of Nicaea and are enshrined in the Nicene Creed. The Trinitarian view emphasizes that God has a will, and that God the Son has two natures, divine and human, though these are never in conflict but joined in the hypostatic union.

With regard to Christianity, religion scholars have differed on whether Mormonism belongs with mainstream Christian tradition as a whole (i.e., Nicene Christianity), with some asserting that it amounts to a distinct Abrahamic religion in itself due to noteworthy theological differences. Rastafarianism, the heterogenous movement that originated in Jamaica in the 1930s, is variously classified by religion scholars as either an international socio-religious movement, a distinct Abrahamic religion, or a new religious movement.

=== Gnosticism ===
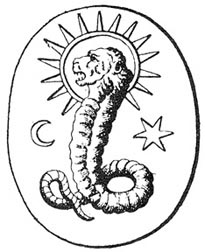
A lion-faced, serpentine deity found on a Gnostic gem in Bernard de Montfaucon's L'antiquité expliquée et représentée en figures, a depiction of Yaldabaoth.

Gnosticism originated in the late 1st century CE in non-rabbinical Jewish and early Christian sects. In the formation of Christianity, various sectarian groups, labeled "gnostics" by their opponents, emphasised spiritual knowledge (gnosis) of the divine spark within, over faith (pistis) in the teachings and traditions of the various communities of Christians. Gnosticism presents a distinction between the highest, unknowable God, and the Demiurge, "creator" of the material universe. The Gnostics considered the most essential part of the process of salvation to be this personal knowledge, in contrast to faith as an outlook in their worldview along with faith in the ecclesiastical authority.

In Gnosticism, the biblical serpent in the Garden of Eden was praised and thanked for bringing knowledge (gnosis) to Adam and Eve and thereby freeing them from the malevolent Demiurge's control. Gnostic Christian doctrines rely on a dualistic cosmology that implies the eternal conflict between good and evil, and a conception of the serpent as the liberating savior and bestower of knowledge to humankind opposed to the Demiurge or creator god, identified with the Hebrew God of the Old Testament.

Gnostic Christians considered the Hebrew God of the Old Testament as the evil, false god and creator of the material universe, and the Unknown God of the Gospel, the father of Jesus Christ and creator of the spiritual world, as the true, good God. In the Archontic, Sethian, and Ophite systems, Yaldabaoth (Yahweh) is regarded as the malevolent Demiurge and false god of the Old Testament who sinned by claiming divinity for himself and generated the material universe and keeps the souls trapped in physical bodies, imprisoned in the world full of pain and suffering that he created.

However, not all Gnostic movements regarded the creator of the material universe as inherently evil or malevolent. For instance, Valentinians believed that the Demiurge is merely an ignorant and incompetent creator, trying to fashion the world as good as he can, but lacking the proper power to maintain its goodness. All Gnostics were regarded as heretics by the proto-orthodox Early Church Fathers.

=== Mormonism ===
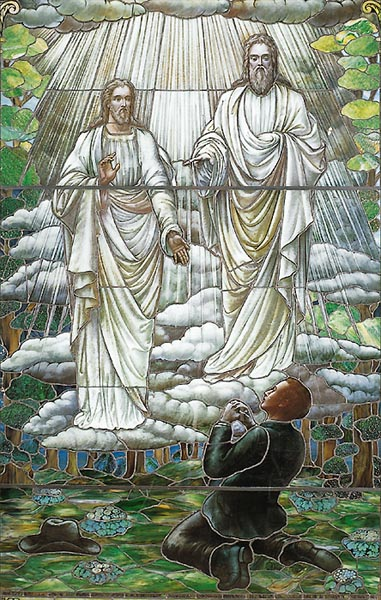
In his 1838 personal history, Joseph Smith wrote that he had seen two personages in the spring of 1820. In 1843, Smith stated that these personages, God the Father and Jesus Christ, had separate, tangible bodies.

In the belief system held by the Christian churches that adhere to the Latter Day Saint movement and most Mormon denominations, including the Church of Jesus Christ of Latter-day Saints (LDS Church), the term God refers to Elohim (God the Father), whereas Godhead means a council of three distinct gods: Elohim (the Eternal Father), Jehovah (God the Son, Jesus Christ), and the Holy Ghost, in a Non-trinitarian conception of the Godhead. The Father and Son have perfected, material bodies, while the Holy Ghost is a spirit and does not have a body. This differs significantly from mainstream Christian Trinitarianism; in Mormonism, the three persons are considered to be physically separate beings, or personages, but united in will and purpose. As such, the term Godhead differs from how it is used in mainstream Christianity. This description of God represents the orthodoxy of the LDS Church, established early in the 19th century.

=== Unitarianism ===
A small minority of Christians, largely coming under the headings of Unitarianism and Unitarian Universalism, hold Non-trinitarian conceptions of God. Unitarian Christians affirm the unitary nature of God as the singular and unique creator of the universe, believe that Jesus Christ was inspired by God in his moral teachings and that he is the savior of mankind, but he is not equal to God himself. The churchmanship of Unitarianism generally reject the doctrine of original sin, and may include liberal denominations or Unitarian Christian denominations that are more conservative, with the latter being known as biblical Unitarians.

The birth of the Unitarian faith is proximate to the Radical Reformation, beginning almost simultaneously among the Protestant Polish Brethren in the Polish–Lithuanian Commonwealth and in the Principality of Transylvania in the mid-16th century; the first Unitarian Christian denomination known to have emerged during that time was the Unitarian Church of Transylvania, founded by the Unitarian preacher and theologian Ferenc Dávid (c. 1520 – 1579). As is typical of Christian dissenters and nonconformists, Unitarianism does not constitute one single Christian denomination; rather, it refers to a collection of both existing and extinct Christian groups (whether historically related to each other or not) that share a common theological concept of the unitary nature of God.

== Islam ==
In Islam, God (Allah) (Arabic: ٱلل‍َّٰه, romanized: Allāh, IPA: [ɑɫˈɫɑː(h)], lit. "the God") is the supreme being, all-powerful and all-knowing creator, sustainer, ordainer, and judge of the universe. Islam puts a heavy emphasis on the conceptualization of God as strictly singular (tawḥīd). He is considered to be unique (wāḥid) and inherently one of them (aḥad), all-merciful and omnipotent. According to the Qurʾān, there are 99 Names of God (al-asmāʾ al-ḥusnā, "the best names") each of which evoke a distinct characteristic of God. All these names refer to Allah, considered to be the supreme and all-comprehensive divine Arabic name. Among the 99 Names of God, the most famous and most frequent of these names are "the Entirely Merciful" (al-Raḥmān) and "the Especially Compassionate" (al-Raḥīm).

Islam rejects the doctrine of the Incarnation and the notion of a personal God as anthropomorphic, because it is seen as demeaning to the transcendence of God. The Qurʾān prescribes the fundamental transcendental criterion in the following verses: "The Lord of the heavens and the earth and what is between them, so serve Him and be patient in His service. Do you know any one equal to Him?" (19:65); "(He is) the Creator of the heavens and the earth: there is nothing whatever like unto Him, and He is the One that hears and sees (all things)" (42:11); "And there is none comparable unto Him" (112:4). Therefore, Islam strictly rejects all forms of anthropomorphism and anthropopathism of the concept of God, and thus categorically rejects the Christian concept of the Trinity or division of persons in the Godhead.

Muslims believe that Allah is the same God worshipped by the members of the Abrahamic religions that preceded Islam, i.e. Judaism and Christianity (29:46). Creation and ordering of the universe is seen as an act of prime mercy for which all creatures sing his glories and bear witness to his unity and lordship. According to the Qurʾān: "No vision can grasp Him, but His grasp is over all vision. He is above all comprehension, yet is acquainted with all things" (6:103). Similarly to Jews, Muslims explicitly reject the divinity of Jesus and don't believe in him as the incarnated God or Son of God, but instead consider him a human prophet and the promised Messiah sent by God, although the Islamic tradition itself is not unanimous on the question of Jesus' death and afterlife.

== Druze faith ==
The Druze faith is the esoteric and ethnic religion of the Druzes, a group of Arab tribes that migrated at different times from southern Arabia to settle in Wādī al-Taym, present-day Lebanon. Their religion emerged in Cairo as an offshoot of the Ismā‘īli denomination of Shiʿa Islam and developed in the Eastern Mediterranean during the 10th century CE, after the Ismā‘īli Muslims had established the Fatimid Caliphate in North Africa and subsequently conquered Egypt in 969. The Fatimid rulers claimed to be both caliphs and imams, endowed with heavenly powers from God, and fulfilling a messianic role. During the reign of al-Ḥākim bi-Amr Allāh (996–1021), the imam-caliph of the Fatimid dynasty, a group of sages, eager to see the messianic promise fulfilled, began to propagate his "call to monotheism" (al-daʿwa al-Tawḥīdiyya) or "call of Ḥākim" (al-daʿwa al-Ḥākimiyya) in the Levant, from 1017 to 1043. His followers called themselves Ahl al-Tawḥīd ("People of the Unity [of God]") and Mūwaḥḥidūn ("Unitarians"), while outsiders called their new religion al-Druziyya.

The Druze conception of God is declared by them to be one of strict and uncompromising unity. He is described as the Supreme Being, inaccessible, omniscient, omnipresent, imperishable, and almighty God who is the creator of all things in the universe. The Druze doctrine states that God is both transcendent and immanent, in which he is above all attributes, but at the same time, he is eternally present: "God is unique, eternal, without a beginning, and abiding without end. He is beyond the comprehension of human understanding and cannot be defined by words or attributes distinct from His essence. He has no body or spirit".

The Druze faith is based on the Epistles of Wisdom (Rasāʾil al-Ḥikma), a set of 111 letters written during the brief period of its propagation in the Levant (1017–1043). Three centuries later, these epistles were collected into six books by ʿĪsā al-Tanūkhī, compiler of the Druze Canon. Their scriptures quote, either fully or in part or sometimes even with a single word, more than 250 verses from the Qurʾān to corroborate their own doctrine and/or to refute Islamic beliefs that were inconsistent with the Druze faith. Despite a long history of religious persecution by Muslims, the Druze faith has survived to the present day and contemporary Druze communities live primarily in Israel, Jordan, Lebanon, and Syria.

== Baháʼí Faith ==
The writings of the Baháʼí Faith describe a monotheistic, personal, inaccessible, omniscient, omnipresent, imperishable, and almighty God who is the creator of all things in the universe. The existence of God and the universe is thought to be eternal, without a beginning or end.

Although transcendent and inaccessible directly, God is nevertheless seen as conscious of the creation, with a will and purpose that is expressed through messengers recognized in the Baháʼí Faith as the Manifestations of God (all the Jewish prophets, Zoroaster, Krishna, the Buddha, Jesus, Muhammad, the Báb, and ultimately Baháʼu'lláh). The purpose of the creation is for the created to have the capacity to know and love its creator, through such methods as prayer, reflection, and being of service to humankind. God communicates his will and purpose to humanity through his intermediaries, the prophets and messengers who have founded various world religions from the beginning of humankind up to the present day, and will continue to do so in the future.

The Manifestations of God reflect his divine attributes, which are creations of God made for the purpose of spiritual enlightenment, onto the physical plane of existence. In the Baháʼí Faith, all physical beings reflect at least one of these attributes, and the human soul can potentially reflect all of them. The Baháʼí conception of God rejects all pantheistic, anthropomorphic, and incarnationist beliefs about God.

== Rastafari ==
Rastafaris refer to God as Jah, a shortened version of Jehovah in the Authorized King James Version (KJV). Jah is said to be immanent, but is also incarnate in each individual. This belief is reflected in the Rastafarian aphorism that "God is man and man is God". Rastafaris describe "knowing" Jah, rather than simply "believing" in him. In seeking to narrow the distance between humanity and divinity, Rastafaris embraces mysticism. Closeness to Jah may be accomplished through Livity, a form of the Nazirite vow derived from the Old Testament. The Rastafarian conception of God has similarities with the Hindu conception of soul (ātman). Jesus is an important figure in Rastafari, but practitioners reject the traditional Christian view of Jesus, and particularly the depiction of him as a White European. Instead, many Rastafaris consider Haile Selassie I as the fulfillment of Psalm 68:31, and therefore the Messiah or Jah incarnate.

== See also ==
- Ancient Canaanite religion
- Ancient Semitic religion
- Argument from morality
- Atenism
- Comparative religion
- Conceptions of God
- Creationism
- Demiurge
- Dystheism
- Ethical monotheism
- Evil God Challenge
- False god
- God of Abraham (Yiddish prayer)
- God of Israel
- Mandaeism
- Misotheism
- Moralistic therapeutic deism
- Names of God
- Outline of theology
- Problem of evil
- Problem of Hell
- Religion in pre-Islamic Arabia
- Satanic Verses
- Schools of Islamic theology
- Semitic Neopaganism
- Sky father
- Table of prophets of Abrahamic religions
- Theistic Satanism
- Theodicy
- Theology of the Unification Church
- Urmonotheismus (primitive monotheism)
- Violence in the Bible
- Violence in the Quran

== Bibliography ==
- Barnett, Michael (2006). "Differences and Similarities Between the Rastafari Movement and the Nation of Islam". Journal of Black Studies. 36 (6). Thousand Oaks, California: SAGE Publications: 873–893. doi:10.1177/0021934705279611. ISSN 1552-4566. JSTOR 40034350. S2CID 145012190.
- Barrett, Leonard E. (1997) [1988]. The Rastafarians. Boston: Beacon Press. ISBN 978-0-8070-1039-6.
- Betz, Arnold Gottfried (2000). "Monotheism". In Freedman, David Noel; Myer, Allen C. (eds.). Eerdmans Dictionary of the Bible. Grand Rapids, Michigan: Wm. B. Eerdmans. pp. 916–917. ISBN 978-90-5356-503-2.
- Bremer, Thomas S. (2015). "Abrahamic religions". Formed From This Soil: An Introduction to the Diverse History of Religion in America. Chichester, West Sussex: Wiley-Blackwell. pp. 19–20. doi:10.1002/9781394260959. ISBN 978-1-4051-8927-9. LCCN 2014030507. S2CID 127980793.
- Bulliet, Richard W. (2015). "Islamo-Christian Civilization". In Blidstein, Moshe; Silverstein, Adam J.; Stroumsa, Guy G. (eds.). The Oxford Handbook of the Abrahamic Religions. Oxford and New York: Oxford University Press. pp. 109–120. doi:10.1093/oxfordhb/9780199697762.013.6. ISBN 978-0-19-969776-2. LCCN 2014960132. S2CID 170430270.
- Byrne, Máire (2011). The Names of God in Judaism, Christianity, and Islam: A Basis for Interfaith Dialogue. London: Continuum International. ISBN 978-1-44116-3-417. LCCN 2010050008.
- Cashmore, E. Ellis (1983). Rastaman: The Rastafarian Movement in England (2nd ed.). London: Counterpoint. ISBN 978-0-04-301164-5.
- Chevannes, Barry (1990). "Rastafari: Towards a New Approach". New West Indian Guide / Nieuwe West-Indische Gids. 64 (3): 127–148. doi:10.1163/13822373-90002020. JSTOR 24027221.
- Christiano, Kevin J.; Kivisto, Peter; Swatos, William H. Jr., eds. (2015) [2002]. "Excursus on the History of Religions". Sociology of Religion: Contemporary Developments (3rd ed.). Walnut Creek, California: AltaMira Press. pp. 254–255. doi:10.2307/3512222. ISBN 978-1-4422-1691-4. JSTOR 3512222. LCCN 2001035412. S2CID 154932078.
- Clarke, Peter B. (1986). Black Paradise: The Rastafarian Movement. New Religious Movements Series. Wellingborough: The Aquarian Press. ISBN 978-0-85030-428-2.
- Cohen, Charles L. (2020). The Abrahamic Religions: A Very Short Introduction. New York: Oxford University Press. ISBN 978-0-19-065434-4. LCCN 2019950996.
- Day, John (2002). Yahweh and the Gods and Goddesses of Canaan. Journal for the Study of the Old Testament: Supplement Series. Vol. 265. Sheffield: Sheffield Academic Press. doi:10.2307/3217888. ISBN 978-0-567-53783-6. JSTOR 3217888. S2CID 161791734.
- Edmonds, Ennis B. (2012). Rastafari: A Very Short Introduction. Oxford: Oxford University Press. ISBN 978-0-19-958452-9.
- Fernández Olmos, Margarite; Paravisini-Gebert, Lizabeth (2011). Creole Religions of the Caribbean: An Introduction from Vodou and Santería to Obeah and Espiritismo (second ed.). New York and London: New York University Press. ISBN 978-0-8147-6228-8.
- Hayes, Christine (2012). "Understanding Biblical Monotheism". Introduction to the Bible. The Open Yale Courses Series. New Haven and London: Yale University Press. pp. 15–28. ISBN 9780300181791. JSTOR j.ctt32bxpm.6.
- Hughes, Aaron W. (2012). "What Are "Abrahamic Religions"?". Abrahamic Religions: On the Uses and Abuses of History. New York: Oxford University Press. pp. 15–33. doi:10.1093/acprof:oso/9780199934645.001.0001. ISBN 978-0-19-993464-5. S2CID 157815976.
- Niehr, Herbert (1995). "The Rise of YHWH in Judahite and Israelite Religion: Methodological and Religio-Historical Aspects". In Edelman, Diana Vikander (ed.). The Triumph of Elohim: From Yahwisms to Judaisms. Leuven: Peeters Publishers. pp. 45–72. ISBN 978-90-5356-503-2. OCLC 33819403.
- Ratzinger, Joseph (2004) [1968]. "Part One: God – Chapter II: The Biblical Belief in God". Introduction to Christianity (2nd Revised ed.). San Francisco: Ignatius Press. pp. 116–136. ISBN 9781586170295. LCCN 2004103523. S2CID 169456327.
- Reynolds, Gabriel S. (2020). "God of the Bible and the Qur'an". Allah: God in the Qurʾān. New Haven and London: Yale University Press. pp. 203–253. doi:10.2307/j.ctvxkn7q4. ISBN 978-0-300-24658-2. JSTOR j.ctvxkn7q4. LCCN 2019947014. S2CID 226129509.
- Römer, Thomas (2015). The Invention of God. Cambridge, Massachusetts: Harvard University Press. doi:10.4159/9780674915732. ISBN 978-0-674-50497-4. JSTOR j.ctvjsf3qb. S2CID 170740919.
- Rubenstein, Hannah; Suarez, Chris (1994). "The Twelve Tribes of Israel: An Explorative Field Study". Religion Today. 9 (2): 1–6. doi:10.1080/13537909408580708.
- Smith, Mark S. (2017). "YHWH's Original Character: Questions about an Unknown God". In Van Oorschot, Jürgen; Witten, Markus (eds.). The Origins of Yahwism. Beihefte zur Zeitschrift für die alttestamentliche Wissenschaft. Vol. 484. Berlin and Boston: De Gruyter. pp. 23–44. doi:10.1515/9783110448221-002. ISBN 978-3-11-042538-3. S2CID 187378834.
- Van der Toorn, Karel (1999). "God (I)". In Van der Toorn, Karel; Becking, Bob; Van der Horst, Pieter W. (eds.). Dictionary of Deities and Demons in the Bible (2nd ed.). Leiden: Brill Publishers. pp. 352–365. doi:10.1163/2589-7802_DDDO_DDDO_Godi. ISBN 978-90-04-11119-6.
- Van der Horst, Pieter W. (1999). "God (II)". In Van der Toorn, Karel; Becking, Bob; Van der Horst, Pieter W. (eds.). Dictionary of Deities and Demons in the Bible (2nd ed.). Leiden: Brill Publishers. pp. 365–370. doi:10.1163/2589-7802_DDDO_DDDO_Godii. ISBN 978-90-04-11119-6.
