= Baháʼí Faith and the unity of humanity =

Central doctrine of the Baháʼí Faith that promotes the unity of mankind

Unity of humanity is one of the central teachings of the Baháʼí Faith. The Baháʼí teachings state that since all humans have been created in the image of God, God does not make any distinction between people regardless of race or colour. Thus, because all humans have been created equal, they all require equal opportunities and treatment. Thus the Baháʼí view promotes the unity of humanity, and that people's vision should be world-embracing and that people should love the whole world rather than just their nation. The teaching, however, does not equate unity with uniformity, but instead the Baháʼí writings advocate for the principle of unity in diversity where the variety in the human race is valued.

== Oneness ==
The Baháʼí teaching of the unity of humanity (also known as the oneness of humanity) stems from the teaching that all humans have been created equal in the image of God, and that God does not make any distinction between people. The teaching emphasizes the unity of humanity transcending all divisions of race, nation, gender, caste, and social class, while celebrating its diversity. The Baháʼí writings states that since the human race is one unified organic unit, all people have the same basic capacities, and that the physical differences, such as skin colour, are superficial and do not make one ethnic group superior to another.

In the Baháʼí view, humanity has always constituted one group, but that ignorance, prejudice and power-seeking have prevented the recognition of the oneness of humanity. The historical differences that have existed between different ethnic groups is attributable to differences in education and cultural opportunities over a long-term, as well as to racial prejudice and oppression.

=== Unity in diversity ===
In the Baháʼí view, unity does not equal uniformity, but instead the Baháʼí writings advocate for the principle of unity in diversity where the variety in the human race is valued. ʻAbdu'l-Bahá, the son of the founder of the religion, compared the human race to a flower garden where the garden was made more beautiful by its diversities of colour and form.

The world of humanity is like unto a rose garden and the various races, tongues and people are like unto contrasting flowers. The diversity of colors in a rose-garden adds to the charm and beauty of the scene as variety enhances unity.

The Baháʼí writings note that unity will not be arrived at through the suppression of difference, but instead when each respects the intrinsic value of other individuals and cultures. In this view, it is not the diversity that causes conflict, but rather people's intolerance and prejudice towards diversity.

The cultural norms in the religion have gone through major transitions. In the later 1930s and 1940s Baháʼís in the West began a systematic implementation of the Tablets of the Divine Plan towards Latin America. At a certain stage of the process regional coordinating committees were appointed and a stated purpose for them was to facilitate a shift in the balance of roles from North American leading guidance and Latin cooperation to Latin leading guidance and North American cooperation. The process was well underway by 1950 and was to be enforced about 1953. By 1961 most Latin and South American countries had their own national assembly. See Baháʼí Faith in Latin America. Almost in parallel with this process in the West in the East Baháʼís in India were embarking on a comparable process. The Baháʼí message had for decades been primarily addressed to Indian Muslims and Parsees (Zoroastrians), a re-interpretation of the Baháʼí message in accordance with Hindu ideas was undertaken to reach the masses of Hindus. In two more years almost as many people converted as had been Baháʼís through regions of Madhya Pradesh, Uttar Pradesh, Andhra Pradesh and Gujarat. See Baháʼí Faith in India.

While those early processes continued locally international attention shifted to Africa for Baháʼís in the West and East. In Africa there was widespread conversions to the religion following the 1950s. It was emphasized that pioneers be self-effacing and focus their efforts not on the colonial leadership but on the native Africans – and that the pioneers must show by actions the sincerity of their sense of service to the Africans in bringing the religion and then the Africans who understand their new religion are to be given freedom to rise up and spread the religion according to their own sensibilities and the pioneers to disperse or step into the background. See Baháʼí Faith in Africa.

Since then other examples of this pattern of growing respect for cultures has taken hold in specific instances. Unlike the spread of Christianity within Indian country, in the United States, the Baháʼí Faith has never been associated with a fortification of colonial occupation, Euro-American assimilation, or forced conversions of Native Americans. Indeed, in 1960 Hand of the Cause Rúhíyyih Khánum asked for forgiveness for the injustices her race had done and praised the great past of the native peoples. And in 1963 anthropologist Alice Beck Kehoe, a well known researcher of Native Americans, observed that the Baháʼí Faith is considered by its members to be a universal faith, not tied to any one particular culture, religious background, language, or even country of origin. See Baháʼí Faith and Native Americans. In Papua New Guinea whereas Christian missionaries openly opposed traditional funerary art and performances, the Baháʼís encouraged their production as a form of worship. Thus while Nalik Baháʼís are regarded by other Naliks as arbiters of traditional knowledge and practices, the Christian missions and their followers are seen as antagonistic to kastom. See Baháʼí Faith in Papua New Guinea.

=== Elimination of prejudice ===
One of the main principles of the Baháʼí Faith that comes about from the unity of humanity is the elimination of all forms of prejudice, and it entails non-discrimination against individuals on such things like race, religion, gender or class. ʻAbdu'l-Bahá states that while the challenge is large, social prejudices including religious, political, and patriotic lead to war, and thus the elimination of prejudice was essential for human well-being. In that regard, the Baháʼí teachings state that the elimination of all forms of prejudice is a fundamental requirement to achieve world unity and peace. Two prime examples of this in action exist – one comes from the American South, and the other from South Africa.

Arriving in the face of the rise of Jim Crow laws and the rise of the Ku Klux Klan as a broad-based national movement and in contrast to Protestant, Catholic and Jewish organizations in South Carolina, the Baháʼís explicitly promoted racial integration from the local level up. Called by the scriptures of their faith to “associate with all the peoples and kindreds of the earth with joy and radiance,” they deliberately sought converts from diverse backgrounds, forging bonds of shared religious identity across traditional social boundaries even when their meetings were raided. By the end of the twentieth century, the Baháʼí Faith was the largest non-Christian religion in South Carolina, and it was well known for its longstanding commitment to promoting racial harmony, interfaith dialogue, and the moral education of children and youth.

In South Africa, faced with the segregated social pattern and laws of Apartheid, the integrated population of Baháʼís had to decide how to be composed in their administrative structures – whether the National Spiritual Assembly would be all black or all white. The Baháʼí community decided that instead of dividing the South African Baháʼí community into two population groups, one black and one white, they instead limited membership in the Baháʼí administration to black adherents, and placed the entire Baháʼí community under the leadership of its black population. In 1997 the National Spiritual Assembly presented a Statement to the Truth and Reconciliation Commission of South Africa which said in part:

Abhorring all forms of prejudice and rejecting any system of segregation, the Baháʼí Faith was introduced on a one-to-one basis and the community quietly grew during the apartheid years, without publicity. Despite the nature of the politics of that time, we presented our teachings on unity and the oneness of humankind to prominent individuals in politics, commerce and academia and leaders of thought including State Presidents.... [b]oth individual Baháʼís and our administrative institutions were continually watched by the security police.... Our activities did not include opposition to the previous Government for involvement in partisan politics and opposition to government are explicitly prohibited by the sacred Texts of our Faith.... During the time when the previous Government prohibited integration within our communities, rather than divide into separate administrative structures for each population group, we opted to limit membership of the Baháʼí Administration to the black adherents who were and remain in the majority of our membership and thereby placed the entire Baháʼí community under the stewardship of its black membership.... The pursuit of our objectives of unity and equality has not been without costs. The "white" Baháʼís were often ostracized by their white neighbours for their association with "non-whites". The Black Baháʼís were subjected to scorn by their black compatriots for their lack of political action and their complete integration with their white Baháʼí brethren. The most tragic loss to our community was the brutal execution of four of our adherents, at our places of worship, three in Mdantsane and one in Umtata.

== Political unity ==
An essential mission in the teachings of Baháʼu'lláh, the founder of the Baháʼí Faith, was to bring about a consciousness in the peoples of the world regarding the oneness of humankind. However, Baháʼu'lláh stated that along with the increase in individual and collective consciousness of the oneness of humanity, new social structures are also needed for the oneness of humanity to be achieved. He wrote:

It is not for him to pride himself who loveth his own country, but rather for him who loveth the whole world. The earth is but one country, and Mankind its citizens.

The Baháʼí teachings thus state that it is not sufficient for humanity to acknowledge its oneness if it still lives in a disunited world that contains prejudice and conflict. In Baháʼí belief, humanity has gone through a process of progressive revelation through various different messengers of God, including Buddha, Moses, Jesus, Muhammad and others, where humanity has grown collectively. It believes that society has been steadily organizing itself with higher levels of unity through the various messengers of God; going from the unity of the family, the tribe, the city-state and the nation. Baháʼí writings state that the next stage of the collective growth is that of world unity and the organization of society as a planetary civilization. Shoghi Effendi, the head of the Baháʼí Faith in the first half of the 20th century, wrote:

The principle of the Oneness of Mankind – the pivot round which all the teachings of Baháʼu'lláh revolve – is no mere outburst of ignorant emotionalism or an expression of vague and pious hope. Its appeal is not to be merely identified with a reawakening of the spirit of brotherhood and good-will among men, nor does it aim solely at the fostering of harmonious cooperation among individual peoples and nations. Its implications are deeper, its claims greater than any which the Prophets of old were allowed to advance. Its message is applicable not only to the individual, but concerns itself primarily with the nature of those essential relationships that must bind all the states and nations as members of one human family.... It implies an organic change in the structure of present-day society, a change such as the world has not yet experienced.... It calls for no less than the reconstruction and the demilitarization of the whole civilized world....

Thus, in the Baháʼí view, unity must be expressed by building a universal and unified social system that is based on spiritual principles. In this view, the fundamental purpose of society is spiritual and is to create a society that is favourable to the healthy development of all its peoples. A new world order based on these principles is envisioned, that will gradually unfold through processes of development that result in the successive stages of the Lesser Peace, the establishment of a World Super-State, the Great Peace, and the Most Great Peace.

== See also ==
- Baháʼí Faith and the unity of religion
- Baháʼí perspective on international human rights
- Community of common destiny for mankind (CPC)
- God in the Baháʼí Faith
- New world order (Baháʼí)
- Global citizenship
- Global civics
- Planetary consciousness
