= God of Israel =

God of Israel may refer to:

- Yahweh, an ancient Semitic deity who was worshipped in ancient Israel and Judah
- God in Judaism, the Jewish conception of God
  - Tetragrammaton, the four-letter name of God in the Hebrew Bible

== See also ==
- God
- God in Abrahamic religions
- God in Christianity
- God in Islam
- God in the Baháʼí Faith
