= Muhammad in the Baháʼí Faith =

Muhammad
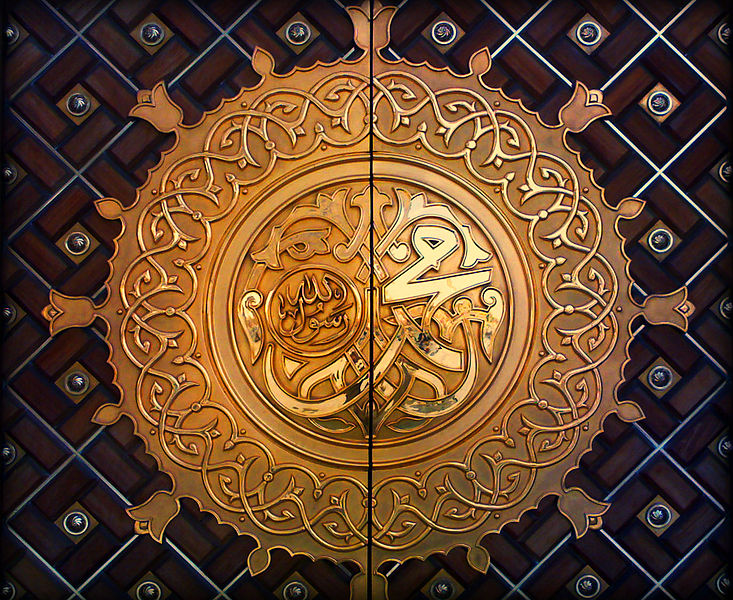
- Gates of the Prophet's Mosque in Medina
- Born: c. 570 CE; Mecca, Hejaz, Arabia
- Died: 8 June 632 CE (Aged 61); Medina, Hejaz, Arabia
- Resting place: Green Dome at the Prophet's Mosque, Medina, Arabia
- Predecessor: ʿĪsā
- Successor: The Báb
- Spouse: See Wives of Muhammad
- Children: See Children of Muhammad
- Parent: Abdullah ibn Abd al-Muttalib (father) Amina bint Wahb (mother)

Baháʼís venerate Muhammad as one of a number of prophets or "Manifestations of God", but consider his teachings (as with the teachings of Jesus and Moses) to have been superseded by those of Baháʼu'lláh, the founder of the Baháʼí Faith.

== Overview ==
Baháʼís believe in Muhammad as a prophet of God, and in the Qurʼan as the Word of God. Bahá'í teachings "affirm that Islam is a true religion revealed by Allah"; accordingly, members of the faith can give full assent to the traditional words of the Shahadah. Muhammad is taken to be one of the most important messengers of God as an "independent" Manifestation of God. Furthermore, Baháʼís believe that the Báb, a central figure in the Baháʼí Faith, was a descendant of Muhammad through Imam Husayn, whose coming was foretold by Muhammad. ʻAbdu'l-Bahá, the son and successor of Baháʼu'lláh, wrote that "His Holiness the Prophet Muhammad made a covenant concerning His Holiness the Báb and the Báb was the One promised by Muhammad, for Muhammad gave the tidings of his coming."

In the Baháʼí writings, Muhammad is known by the titles the "Apostle of God", the "Seal of the Prophets" and the "Day-Star of Truth". Writing of Muhammad, ʻAbdu'l-Bahá states that through God's aid, he was able to unite the warring tribes of the Arabian Peninsula "to such an extent that one thousand tribes were welded into one tribe". This, he writes, despite the fact that he (Muhammad) was an illiterate man born into a cruel and barbarous culture. He was nevertheless responsible for producing "a book in which, in a perfect and eloquent style. He explained the divine attributes and perfections, the prophethood of the Messengers of God, the divine laws, and some scientific facts."

In the Baháʼí Faith Muhammad is regarded as one of the class of "independent Prophets" – that is, those prophets "who are followed" and who "establish a new religion and make new creatures of men". They also "change the general morals, promote new customs and rules, [and] renew the cycle and the law." Along with Muhammad, Abraham, Moses, Jesus, the Báb and Baháʼu'lláh are classed among the "independent Prophets". The religion teaches the unity and the oneness of all the prophets of God. As such, Abraham, Moses, Jesus Christ, Muhammad, the Báb and Baháʼu'lláh are believed to have proclaimed the same message at different times. It is only due to the "difference in their station and mission" that their "words and utterances" ever "appear to diverge and differ." As with all the Prophets of God, Baháʼís believe that Muhammad was sinless. Being holy, these prophets are believed to be pure from sin and purged of faults. In response to Sura 48:2 of the Qurʼan which, referring to Muhammad, states that God forgives his past and future sins, ʻAbdu'l-Bahá states that this address was "in reality for all the people" and is only "apparently directed to Muhammad".

The Baháʼí Faith teaches that Muhammad was a man of peace. On the occasions when he did fight, he only did so in order to defend himself and his followers from the hostile pagan Arab tribes who inhabited the Arabian Peninsula in his time. ʻAbdu'l-Bahá claimed that "Muhammad never fought against the Christians".

== Hadith ==
ʻAbdu'l-Bahá taught that some stories about the teachings, deeds and sayings of Muhammad as described in certain hadith which he perceived to be negative, were fabricated due to fanaticism, ignorance or enmity. He told that most of those who narrated such stories were either members of the "clergy", "antagonistic" or "ignorant Muslims who repeated unfounded traditions about Muhammad which they ignorantly believed to be to His praise." Thus, he says, "some benighted Muslims made His polygamy the pivot of their praises".

While disregarding some hadith about Muhammad as fabrications and exaggerations, ʻAbdu'l-Bahá accepted the authenticity of others. For example, traditions about Muhammad's friendly treatment of the Christians of Najran of whom Muhammad is said to have proclaimed: "If any one infringes their rights, I myself will be his enemy, and in the presence of God I will bring a charge against him." According to Baháʼí belief, in this time Muslims and Christians lived in harmony with each other, however, "after a certain time", due to 'the transgression of both the Muhammadans and the Christians, hatred and enmity arose between them.'

== Seal of the Prophets ==
In contrast to the Muslims, Baháʼís do not believe that Muhammad is the final messenger of God, or rather define eschatology and end times references as metaphorical for changes in the ages or eras of mankind but that it and progress of God's guidance continues. Although, in common with Islam, the title the Seal of the Prophets is reserved for Muhammad, Baháʼís interpret it differently. They believe that the term Seal of the Prophets applies to a specific epoch, and that each prophet is the "seal" of his own epoch. Therefore, in the sense that all the prophets of God are united in the same "Cause of God", having the same underlying message, and all "abiding in the same tabernacle, soaring in the same heaven, seated upon the same throne, uttering the same speech, and proclaiming the same Faith", they can all claim to be "the return of all the Prophets". Likewise, since they all have "a definitely prescribed mission, a predestined revelation, and specially designated limitations", they can all claim to be the "seal of the prophets" for their own epoch. According to this understanding, there is no reason why another prophet cannot follow with a message which is a seal for his own specific epoch.

Baháʼu'lláh cited Sura 5:64 of the Qurʼan in arguing that the censure applied to the Jews in that ayah (that they had sought to limit the power of God to do as he wills) was just as applicable to Muslims who held to the doctrine that no prophets could follow Muhammad. He writes that: "For over a thousand years they have been reciting this verse, and unwittingly pronouncing their censure against the Jews, utterly unaware that they themselves, openly and privily, are voicing the sentiments and belief of the Jewish people".

Muhammad is seen as ending the Adamic cycle, also known as the Prophetic cycle, which is stated to have begun approximately 6,000 years ago, and the Báb and Baháʼu'lláh as starting the Baháʼí cycle, or Cycle of Fulfillment, which will last at least five hundred thousand years with numerous Manifestations of God appearing throughout that time. In fact, Ali, the Commander of the Faithful, stated: "Allah completed the system of warning and presentation of proofs with him (Muhammad) and stopped arguing about and providing proof of the status of His friends who possess divine authority among His creatures.", In the Kitáb-i-Íqán, Baháʼu'lláh makes a direct link between Qurʼan 33:40, about the seal of the prophets, and 33:44, about the promise of the "attainment of the divine Presence" on the day of resurrection, which he interprets as the meeting with the Manifestation of God. The day of resurrection is interpreted as the day of the advent of the Qaʼim or Mahdi.

== The Báb and Muhammad ==
The Báb in a letter written to Mulla Shaykh Ali Turshizi, claims:

The first to swear allegiance to me was Muḥammad the Prophet of God, then 'Alī, then those who were witnesses after him [i.e., the next eleven Imāms], then the Gates of Guidance, then those to whom God had accorded such grace of the prophets and holy ones and witnesses and those who believed in God and his verses.

== See also ==
- Baháʼí Faith and the unity of religion
- Isolated letters of the Qurʼan in the Baháʼí Faith
