= Religious perspectives on Jesus =

Perspectives on Jesus among the world's religions

The religious perspectives on Jesus vary among world religions. Jesus' teachings and the retelling of his life story have significantly influenced the course of human history, and have directly or indirectly affected the lives of billions of people, including non-Christians. He is considered by many to be one of the most influential persons to have ever lived, finding a significant place in numerous cultural contexts.

In Christianity, Jesus is the Messiah (Christ) foretold in the Old Testament and the Son of God. Christians believe that through his death and resurrection, humans can be reconciled to God and thereby are offered salvation and the promise of eternal life. These beliefs emphasize that as the willing Lamb of God, Jesus chose to suffer in Calvary as a sign of his full obedience to the will of his Father, as an "agent and servant of God". Christians view Jesus as a role model, whose God-focused life believers are encouraged to imitate.

In Islam, Jesus (commonly transliterated as Isa) is the Messiah and one of God's highest-ranked and most-beloved prophets. Islam considers Jesus to be neither the incarnation nor the Son of God. He is referred to as the son of Mary in the Qu’ran. Islamic texts emphasize a strict affirmation of monotheism (tawhid) and forbid the association of partners with God, which would be idolatry (shirk).

In the Druze faith, Jesus is considered one of God's important prophets and the Messiah.

The Baháʼí Faith considers Jesus to be one of many manifestations of God, who are a series of personages who reflect the attributes of the divine into the human world. Baháʼís reject the idea that divinity was contained with a single human body.

Apart from his own disciples and followers, the Jews of Jesus' day generally rejected him as the Messiah, as do the great majority of Jews today. Mainstream Jewish scholars argue that Jesus neither fulfilled the Messianic prophecies in the Tanakh nor embodied the personal qualifications of the Messiah.

Other world religions such as Buddhism have no particular view on Jesus, and have but a minor intersection with Christianity.

For non-religious perspectives on Jesus, see historical Jesus.

== Christianity ==
Christian views of Jesus are based on the teachings and beliefs as outlined in the Canonical gospels, New Testament letters, the Christian creeds, as well as specific denominational teachings. These documents outline the key beliefs held by Christians about Jesus, including his divinity, humanity, and earthly life, and that he is the Christ and the Son of God.

Although Christian views of Jesus vary, it is possible to summarize the key beliefs shared among major denominations, as stated in their catechetical or confessional texts. Generally speaking, adhering to the Christian faith requires a belief that Jesus is the Son of God and the Messiah or Christ. Jesus refers to himself as the Son of God in the New Testament.

Christians consider Jesus to be the Messiah (Christ) and believe that through his death and resurrection, humans can be reconciled to God and thereby are offered salvation and the promise of eternal life. These teachings emphasize that as the willing Lamb of God, Jesus chose to suffer in Calvary as a sign of his full obedience to the will of his Father, as an "agent and servant of God". The choice Jesus made thus counter-positions him as a new man of morality and obedience, in contrast to Adam's disobedience.

The five major milestones in the gospel narrative of the life of Jesus are his Baptism, Transfiguration, Crucifixion, Resurrection and Ascension. These are usually bracketed by two other episodes: his Nativity at the beginning and the sending of the Paraclete at the end. The gospel accounts of the teachings of Jesus are often presented in terms of specific categories involving his "works and words", e.g. his ministry, parables and miracles. The words of Jesus include several sermons, in addition to parables that appear throughout the narrative of the Synoptic Gospels (the gospel of John includes no parables).

Christians not only attach theological significance to the works of Jesus, but also to his name. Devotions to the Holy Name of Jesus go back to the earliest days of Christianity. These devotions and feasts exist both in Eastern and Western Christianity.

=== Incarnation ===
Most Christians believe that Jesus was both human and the Son of God. While there has been theological debate over the nature of Jesus, trinitarian Christians generally believe that Jesus is God incarnate, God the Son, and the Holy Spirit, thus "true God and true man," i.e. fully divine and fully human. Jesus, having become fully human in all respects, suffered the pains and temptations of a mortal man, yet He did not sin. As fully God, He defeated death and rose to life again. According to the New Testament, God the Father raised Him from the dead. He ascended to heaven, to be seated at the "right hand of God," and he will return again for the Last Judgment and the establishment of the Kingdom of God.

== Islam ==
In Islam, Jesus (Isa) is considered to be a messenger of God (Allah) and the Messiah (al-Masih) who was sent to guide the Descendants of Israel (Bani Isra'il) with a new scripture, the Gospel (Injil).

The Quran mentions Jesus by name 25 times—more often than Muhammad—and emphasises that Jesus was a mortal human who, like all other prophets, had been divinely chosen to spread God's message. Unlike Christian writings, the Quran does not describe Jesus as the son of God, but as one of four major human messengers (out of many prophets) sent by God throughout history to guide mankind. Jesus is said to have lived a life of piety and generosity, and abstained from eating flesh of swine.

Muslims also believe that Jesus received a Gospel from God, called the Injil. However, Muslims hold that Jesus' original message was lost or altered and that the Christian New Testament does not accurately represent God's original message to mankind.

Despite major differences, the Quran and New Testament overlap in other aspects of Jesus' life; both Muslims and Christians believe that Jesus was miraculously born without a human biological father by the will of God, and that his mother, Mary (Maryam in Arabic), is among the most saintly, pious, chaste and virtuous women ever. The Quran also specifies that Jesus was able to perform miracles—though only by the will of God—including being able to raise the dead, restore sight to the blind and cure lepers. One miracle attributed to Jesus in the Quran, but not in the New Testament, is his being able to speak at only a few days old, to defend his mother from accusations of adultery. It also says that Jesus was a 'word' from God, since he was predicted to come in the Old Testament.

Most Muslims believe that he was neither killed nor crucified, but that God made it appear so to his enemies. With the noteworthy exception of Ahmadi Muslims who believe that Jesus was indeed put on the cross, survived the crucifixion and was not lifted bodily to the heaven, the majority of Muslims believe that Jesus ascended bodily to heaven and is alive. Some Muslim scholars maintain that Jesus was indeed put up on the cross, but did not die on it; rather, he revived and then ascended bodily to heaven. Others say that it was actually Judas Iscariot who was mistakenly crucified by the Romans. Regardless, Muslims believe that Jesus is alive in heaven and will return to the world in the flesh to defeat the Antichrist, once the world has become filled with sin, deception and injustice, and then live out the rest of his natural life.

Islam rejects the Trinitarian Christian view that Jesus was God incarnate or the son of God, that he was ever crucified or resurrected or that he ever atoned for the sins of mankind. The Quran says that Jesus himself, when asked by God if he said that people shall regard him and Mary as gods, will deny this.^{[Quran 5:116]}

== Judaism ==
Judaism rejects the idea of Jesus being God, or a person of a Trinity, or a mediator to God. Judaism also holds that Jesus is not the Messiah, arguing that he had not fulfilled the Messianic prophecies in the Tanakh nor embodied the personal qualifications of the Messiah. According to Jewish tradition, there were no more prophets after Malachi, who lived centuries before Jesus and delivered his prophesies about 420 BC.

According to Conservative Judaism, Jews who believe Jesus is the Messiah have "crossed the line out of the Jewish community". Reform Judaism, the modern progressive movement, states "For us in the Jewish community anyone who claims that Jesus is their savior is no longer a Jew and is an apostate".

=== Jesus in Jewish writings ===
The Babylonian Talmud includes stories of Yeshu יֵשׁוּ; the vast majority of contemporary historians disregard these as sources about the historical Jesus. Contemporary Talmud scholars hold similar views, as well as considering the stories to be commentary about the relationship between Judaism and Christians or other sectarians.

The Mishneh Torah, a 12th century authoritative work of Jewish law, states in Hilkhot Melakhim 11:10–11 that Jesus misled most of the world to worship other gods but that his ultimate purpose is to "prepare the entire world to serve God together".

Even Jesus the Nazarene who thought he would be the Messiah and was killed by the court, was already prophesied by Daniel. So that it was said, "And the outlaws of your nation shall rise up to set forth a (prophetic) vision, and they will stumble." There is a greater obstacle than this: All the prophets spoke that the Messiah would redeem Israel, and save them, and gather their banished ones, and strengthen their commandments. This caused Israel to perish by the sword, and to scatter their remnant, and to humiliate them, and to change the Torah, and to mislead most of the world into worshiping gods other than God.

However, the thoughts of the Creator of the world - there is no power in man to attain them, because our ways are not His ways, nor our thoughts His thoughts. And all these words of Jesus the Nazarene, and of the Ishmaelite who stood after Him - their purpose is but to pave the way for the Messiah, the King, and to prepare the entire world to serve the Lord together; As it is said, "For then I will turn to the nations (giving them) a pure language, to call all of them in the name of the Lord, and together serve Him of one accord".

== Samaritanism ==
At the time of Jesus, the Samaritans constituted a significant Israelite religious community whose worship was centred on Mount Gerizim and whose Pentateuch, priesthood, and traditions were distinct from those of the Jews. They remained a substantial population in Roman and Byzantine Palestine into late antiquity, developing an extensive religious and literary culture before revolts and Byzantine repression contributed to their demographic decline. The Samaritan Tolidah refers polemically to Jesus as the son of Joseph the Carpenter and “Mary the adulteress,” (ישוע בן מרים בן יוסף נגארה בן הנאפת) and places his death under Tiberius and Pontius Pilate during the tenure of High Priest Yahunatan, whose term is listed as twenty-seven years.

== Gnosticism ==
Jesus was primarily seen by various Gnostic sects, such as the quasi-extinct Manichaeism, as a divine messenger of Light and a bringer of secret spiritual knowledge (gnosis), rather than a traditional atoning savior. Gnostic cosmology conceivs him as an aeon sent from the Pleroma to liberate human souls from the deception of the material world, which was created by an evil Demiurge.

Regarding his nature, traditions diverged between Docetism (viewing his physical body and suffering as illusory), and separationist views, where the divine Christ descended upon the man Jesus at baptism and departed before the crucifixion. Texts from the Nag Hammadi library (such as the Gospel of Thomas, the Apocryphon of John, the Sophia of Jesus Christ) emphasize this esoteric wisdom and the mission to spark an inner awakening within humanity.

== Theosophy and Anthroposophy ==
Jesus in Theosophy is considered one of the Masters of the Ancient Wisdom, belonging to the human members of the so-called White Brotherhood, who incarnate from time to time on Earth to favor the spiritual evolution of humanity.

He is distinguished from the Christ entity, who instead means the divine spark "indwelling" each individual human consciousness. In Blavatsky's opinion, the "Jesus God" is a myth concocted two centuries after the real Hebrew Jesus died; the man Jesus of Nazareth was a spiritual reformer, rather named Chrestos («a good man»); he was only a vehicle, while the "Christ" is the cosmic entity of the Logos, who unites with him at baptism and abandons him shortly before the crucifixion, allowing him to ascend through the hierarchy of initiations.

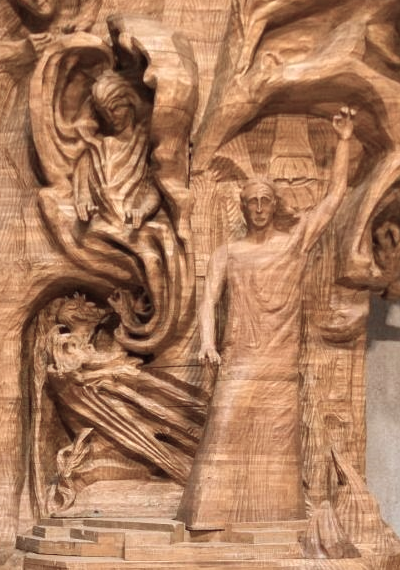
Wooden sculpture in the Goetheanum in Dornach, by Rudolf Steiner, depicting Jesus Christ as the "representative of humanity", placed in the center as a mediator between the two opposing principles of evil: Lucifer (top left), and Ahriman (bottom).

The real Christ of every Christian is the Vach, the "mystical Voice," while the man Jeshu was but a mortal like any of us, an adept more by his inherent purity and ignorance of real Evil, than by what he had learned with his initiated Rabbis and the already (at that period) fast degenerating Egyptian Hierophants and priests.

— Vicente Hao Chin, Jr., The Mahatma Letters to A.P. Sinnett in chronological sequence, n. 111, Quezon City, Theosophical Publishing House, 1993, p. 377

According to theosophists as Alice Bailey, in particular, there are three spiritual «departments» subordinate to the Lord of the World (Sanat Kumara), the second of which, corresponding to the ray of love, is directed by Maitreya (a figure borrowed from Buddhism), known in the West precisely as the Christ. They said that Maitreya had previously incarnated as Krishna, a figure from Hinduism.

Jesus is also a recognized master in Anthroposophy, distinct from Christ too, but this latter is not simply the head of a department: he is, instead, the supreme spirit of the Sun, and the highest of the Elohim.

He chose to incarnate in a human life (Jesus of Nazareth, during the years of his ministry) becoming the "new Adam", who through his death and resurrection gave the gift not of a doctrine but of his "body", capable of restoring the formative forces of physical bodies for all people, not just for his followers, by infusing his Christ-impulse into the spiritual atmosphere of the Earth.

According to Rudolf Steiner, there were two different Jesus children involved in the Incarnation of the Christ: one child descended from Solomon, as described in the Gospel of Matthew, the other child from Nathan, as described in the Gospel of Luke. The first was joined by the wise spirit of Zarathustra, and the second by the compassionate astral body of Buddha, so that they could unite in the adult Jesus, before giving way to the coming of the Christ Spirit at the moment of baptism.

The so-called Jesus Christ thus became a central balancing force mediating the two opposing polarities of evil, namely the fanatical mysticism of Lucifer, and the cold materialism of Ahriman: corresponding to the moments of diastole and systole (expansion and contraction) in Goethe's conception. Steiner also criticized the current of Jesuitism, based on the subjugation of the will to the human figure of Jesus, proposing instead Spiritual Science as a path of thought, to understand the profound meaning of divine Christ, including reincarnation and karma.

== Baháʼí Faith ==
The Baháʼí Faith consider Jesus to be a manifestation of God, who are a series of personages who reflect the attributes of the divine into the human world for the progress and advancement of human morals and civilization. In Baháʼí belief, the Manifestations have always been sent by God, and always will, as part of the single progressive religion from God bringing more teachings through time to help humanity progress. The Manifestations of God are taught to be "one and the same", and in their relationship to one another have both the station of unity and the station of distinction. In this way each Manifestation of God manifested the Word of God and taught the same religion, with modifications for the particular audience's needs and culture. Bahá'u'lláh wrote that since each Manifestation of God has the same divine attributes, they can be seen as the spiritual "return" of all the previous Manifestations of God. In this way, Baháʼís believe that Bahá'u'lláh is, in both respects, the return of Jesus.

== Druze ==
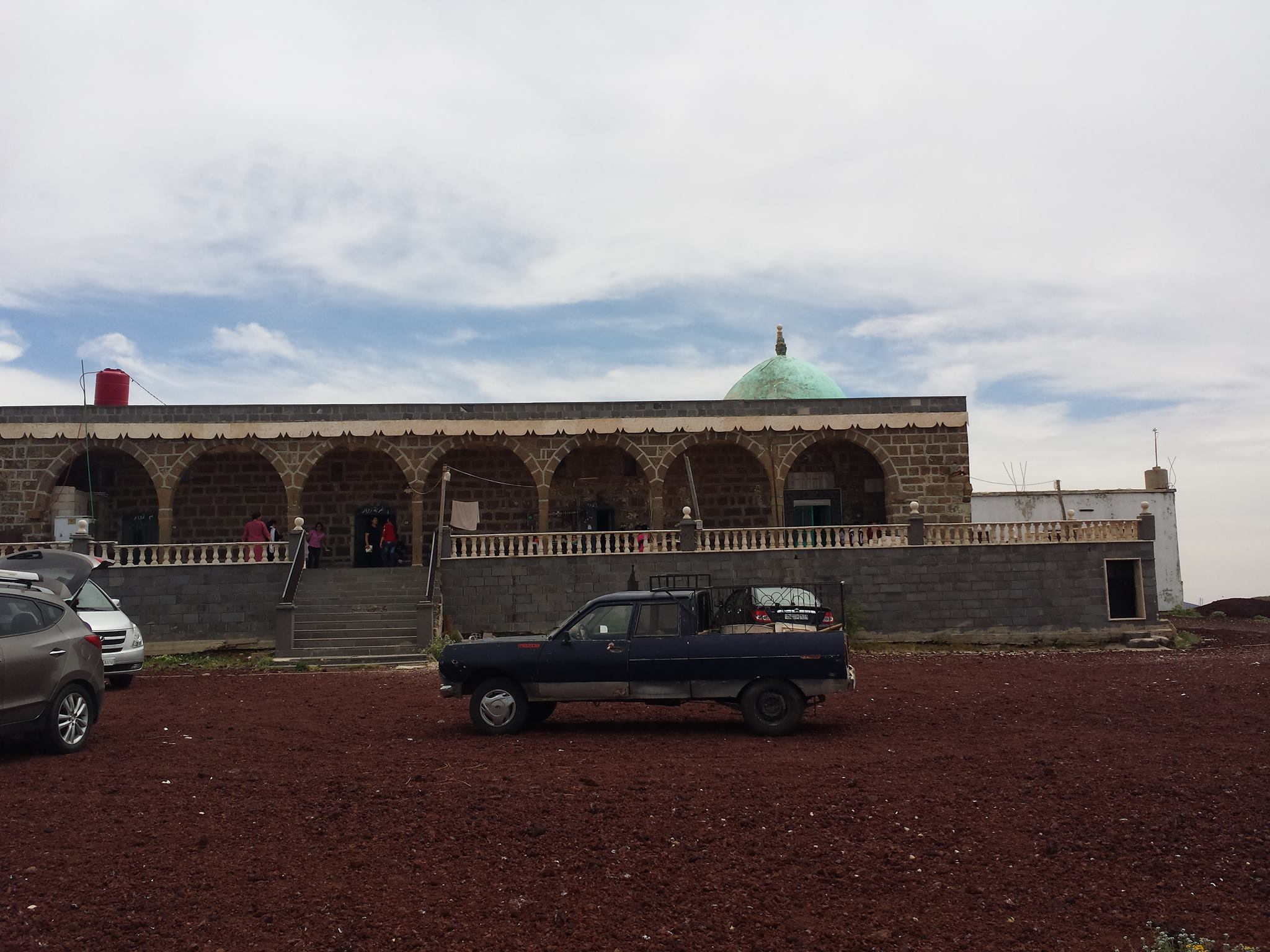
The Druze maqam of Al-masih (Jesus) in As-Suwayda Governorate

In the Druze faith, Jesus is considered one of God's important prophets and the Messiah, being among the seven prophets who appeared in different periods of history. The Druze venerate Jesus "the son of Joseph and Mary" and his four disciples, who wrote the Gospels. In the Druze tradition, Jesus is known under three titles: the True Messiah (al-Masih al-Haq), the Messiah of all Nations (Masih al-Umam), and the Messiah of Sinners. This is due, respectively, to the belief that Jesus delivered the true Gospel message, the belief that he was the Saviour of all nations, and the belief that he offers forgiveness.

According to the Druze manuscripts Jesus is the Greatest Imam and the incarnation of Ultimate Reason (Akl) on earth and the first cosmic principle (Hadd), and regards Jesus and Hamza ibn Ali as the incarnations of one of the five great celestial powers, who form part of their system. Druze believe that Hamza ibn Ali was a reincarnation of Jesus, and that Hamza ibn Ali is the true Messiah, who directed the deeds of the messiah Jesus "the son of Joseph and Mary", but when Jesus "the son of Joseph and Mary" strayed from the path of the true Messiah, Hamza filled the hearts of the Jews with hatred for him - and for that reason, they crucified him, according to the Druze manuscripts. Despite this, Hamza ibn Ali took him down from the cross and allowed him to return to his family, in order to prepare men for the preaching of his religion.

In an epistle ascribed to one of the founders of Druzism, Baha al-Din al-Muqtana, probably written sometime between AD 1027 and AD 1042, accused the Jews of crucifying Jesus.

== Other ==
Traditionally, Buddhists as a group take no particular view on Jesus, and Buddhism and Christianity have but a minor intersection. However, some scholars have noted similarities between the life and teachings of Gautama Buddha and Jesus. These similarities might be attributed to Buddhist missionaries sent as early as Emperor Ashoka around 250 BC in many of the Greek Seleucid kingdoms that existed then and then later became the same regions in which Christianity began.

The Vietnamese syncretic religion Cao Dai locates Jesus in the celestial Council of Great Spirits that directs the universe.

In the Ahmadiyya Islamic view, Jesus survived the crucifixion and later travelled to India, where he lived as a prophet (and died) under the name of Yuz Asaf.

According to The Urantia Book, Jesus was one of numerous sons of God named Michael of Nebadon, who took on earthly incarnation.

In Raëlism, Jesus and several other religious figures are considered prophets sent by an extraterrestrial race called the Elohim.

The Religious Science movement considers Jesus to be a teacher of “Science of Mind”.

The Lacandon people of Central America acknowledge Äkyantho', the god of foreigners. He has a son named Hesuklistos (Jesus Christ) who is supposed to be the god of the foreigners. They recognize that Hesuklistos is a god but do not feel he is worthy of worship as he is a minor god.

Hinduism has no established set of beliefs and no universal or common view of Jesus. However, a lot of Hindus, including religious and political leaders, tend to variously consider Jesus as either a Āchārya, Sadhu or Avatar. Some Hare Krishnas also claim that Jesus Christ is an exemplary Hare Krishna devotee, and was predicted and prophesied in the Bhavishya Purana.

== See also ==
- Christianity and Theosophy
- Christianity and world religions
- Life of Jesus in the New Testament

== Sources ==
- Campbell, B. F. (1980). Ancient Wisdom Revived: A History of the Theosophical Movement. University of California Press. ISBN 9780520039681.
- Poller, Jake (2018). ""Under a Glamour": Annie Besant, Charles Leadbeater and Neo-Theosophy". In Christine Ferguson; Andrew Radford (eds.). The Occult Imagination in Britain: 1875–1947. Abingdon and New York: Routledge. pp. 77–93. ISBN 978-1-4724-8698-1.
