= Baháʼí Faith and the unity of religion =

Core teaching of the Baháʼí Faith

Unity of religion is a core teaching of the Baháʼí Faith which states that there is a fundamental unity in many of the world's religions. The principle states that the teachings of the major religions are part of a single plan directed from the same God. It is one of the core teachings of the Baháʼí Faith, alongside the unity of God, and the unity of humanity.

The Baháʼí teachings state that there is but one religion which is progressively revealed by God, through prophets/messengers, as humanity matures and its capacity to understand also grows. The outward differences in the religions, the Baháʼí writings state, are due to the exigencies of the time and place the religion was revealed.

The Baháʼí writings state that the essential nature of the messengers is twofold: they are at once human and divine. They are divine in that they all come from the same God and expound his teachings. In this light they are seen as one and the same. At the same time they are separate individuals (their human reality) and known by different names. Each fulfills a definite mission, and is entrusted with a particular revelation.

Baháʼu'lláh, the founder of the Baháʼí Faith, claimed to be the most recent, but not the last, in a series of divine educators. He mentioned the Jewish prophets, Zoroaster, Jesus, Muhammad, and the Báb as other divine educators before him, and 'Abdu'l-Bahá (his son and successor) also mentioned Krishna and Gautama Buddha.

== Unity of religion ==
The Baháʼí teachings state that religion has been revealed progressively from the same God through different prophets/messengers, who at different times through history and in different locations come to provide the teachings of God. In this way the Baháʼí teachings see that religion has the same foundation, and that the various religions are "different stages in the eternal history and constant evolution of one religion".

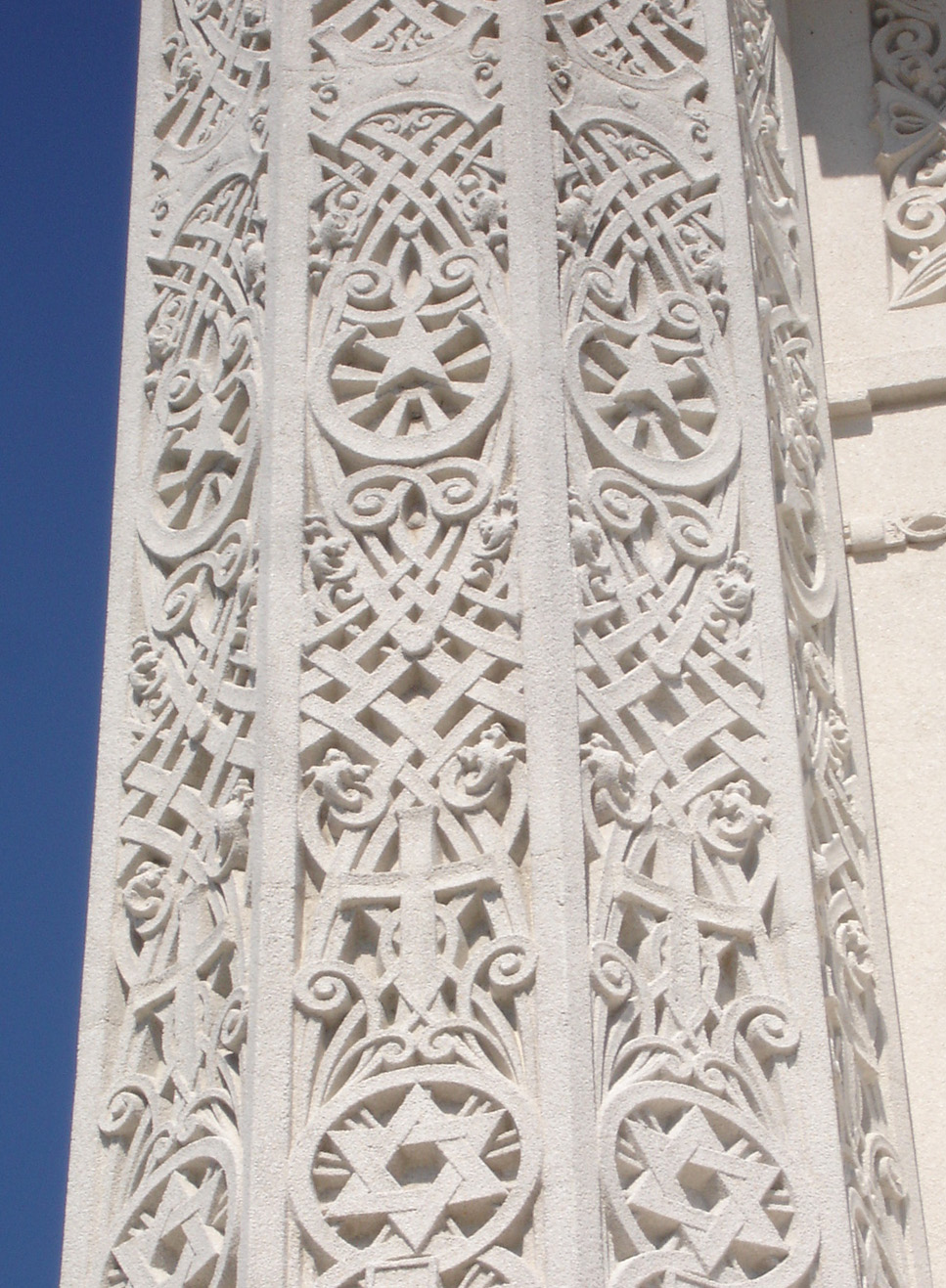
Symbols of many religions on a pillar of the Baháʼí House of Worship in Wilmette, Illinois, U.S.

The Baháʼí concept of progressive revelation states that God is regular and periodic in revealing his will to mankind through messengers/prophets, which are named Manifestations of God. Each messenger in turn establishes a covenant and founds a religion. This process of revelation, according to the Baháʼí writings, is also never ceasing, The general theme of the successive and continuous religions founded by Manifestations of God is that there is an evolutionary tendency, and that each Manifestation of God brings a larger measure of revelation (or religion) to humankind than the previous one. The differences in the revelation brought by the Manifestations of God is stated to be not inherent in the characteristics of the Manifestation of God, but instead attributed to the various worldly, societal and human factors; these differences are in accordance with the "conditions" of the time the messenger came and the "spiritual capacity" of humanity. The Baháʼí teaching states that while certain aspects of religious teachings are absolute, others are relative; for example all religions would prescribe honesty and denounce theft, but each religion may have different laws related to social institutions such as divorce. These differences in the teachings of the various religions are seen in the Baháʼí teachings to be needed since human society has slowly and gradually evolved through higher stages of unification from the family to tribes and then nations.

Thus religious truth is seen to be relative to its recipients and not absolute; while the messengers proclaimed eternal moral and spiritual truths that are renewed by each messenger, they also changed their message to reflect the particular spiritual and material evolution of humanity at the time of the appearance of the messenger. In the Baháʼí view, since humanity's spiritual capacity and receptivity has increased over time, the extent to which these spiritual truths are expounded changes.

== Unity of the prophets ==
The Manifestation of God is a concept in the Baháʼí Faith that refers to what are commonly called prophets. The Manifestations of God are a series of personages who reflect the attributes of the divine into the human world for the progress and advancement of human morals and civilization. The Manifestations of God are the only channel for humanity to know about God, and they act as perfect mirrors reflecting the attributes of God into the physical world. Baháʼí teachings hold that the motive force in all human development is due to the coming of the Manifestations of God.

In Baháʼí belief all of the Manifestations of God are from the same God and have the same spiritual and metaphysical nature, and that there is absolute equality between them. The differences between the various Manifestations of God and their teachings, Baháʼu'lláh explained, are due to the varying needs and capacities of the civilization in which they appeared, and not due to any differences in their level of importance or nature.

The Manifestations of God are taught to be "one and the same", and in their relationship to one another have both the station of unity and the station of distinction. In this sense, the Manifestations of God all fulfill the same purpose and perform the same function by mediating between God and creation. In this way each Manifestation of God manifested the Word of God and taught the same religion, with modifications for the particular audience's needs and culture. Baháʼu'lláh wrote that since each Manifestation of God has the same divine attributes they can be seen as the spiritual "return" of all the previous Manifestations of God.

The Baháʼí belief in the oneness of the Manifestations of God does not mean, however, that the same individual soul is born again at different times and in different physical bodies. In the Baháʼí view, the various Manifestations of God were all different personalities and had separate individual realities. Instead, their equality is based on them having manifested and revealed the qualities of God to the same degree.

There is no definitive list of Manifestations of God, but Baháʼu'lláh and ʻAbdu'l-Bahá referred to several personages as Manifestations; they include Adam, Noah, Krishna, Moses, Abraham, Zoroaster, Buddha, Jesus and Muhammad. The Báb, as well as Baháʼu'lláh, were included in this definition. Thus religious history is interpreted as a series of periods or "dispensations", where each Manifestation brings a somewhat broader and more advanced revelation, suited for the time and place in which it was expressed.

Baháʼís do not claim that the Baháʼí revelation is the final stage in God's direction in the course of human spiritual evolution. The Baháʼí writings contain assurances that after 1,000 years, another Manifestation of God could appear to advance human civilization.

== Views on truth, dualism, and non-dualism ==
The Baháʼí ringstone symbol, representing the world of God, the world of the Manifestations of God and creation

One of the fundamental principles of the Baháʼí Faith is that religious truth is not absolute but relative. The teachings of the different world religions are seen as 'facets of one truth'. Baháʼí texts include statements of a dualist nature (e.g. in the Book of Certitude) and statements of a monist nature (e.g. in the Seven Valleys and the Hidden Words). Moojan Momen, in his translation of ʻAbdu'l-Bahá's commentary on the Islamic tradition "I was a Hidden Treasure", states that the differences between dualist and monist views are reconciled by the teaching that these opposing viewpoints are caused by differences in the observers themselves, not in that what is observed. This is not a 'higher truth/lower truth' position. God is unknowable. For man it is impossible to get any knowledge of God or the Absolute, because any knowledge that one has, is relative. Theological differences about God are caused by imagination, as God's essence can not be described. Less stress is given to metaphysical subjects, while ethics and social action are emphasized.

Ian Kluge holds a different view than Momen, which he calls 'relationalism' (associated with the process philosophy as described by A.N. Whitehead and his successors). Kluge states that the Baháʼí teachings do not accept an ontological monism and that not all views can be correct.

Peter Terry also disagrees with Momen, noting that the quotation about relativism refers to progressive revelation: "... that religious truth is not absolute but relative, that Divine Revelation is a continuous and progressive process...". He also states that monism and dualism are both not compatible with the three main divisions in Bahá'í cosmology: the world of God, the world of the Manifestations of God and the World of Creation.

Keven Brown concludes that the "realities of things are manifestations of the first thing to emanate from God, the Primal Will", but they are "not manifestations of the unknowable and inaccessible Godhead", and that according to the Baháʼí teachings the "true meaning of union (or knowing) in the mystic quest is not union with (or knowing) the Essence of God (which is impossible to attain), but recognition of the Manifestation of God for the day in which one lives". Nader Saiedi describes the Báb's explanations about the dual stations of the "Point", another term for the Primal Will of God.

Roland Faber has discussed the subject from a non-dualist Buddhist perspective.

== Syncretism ==
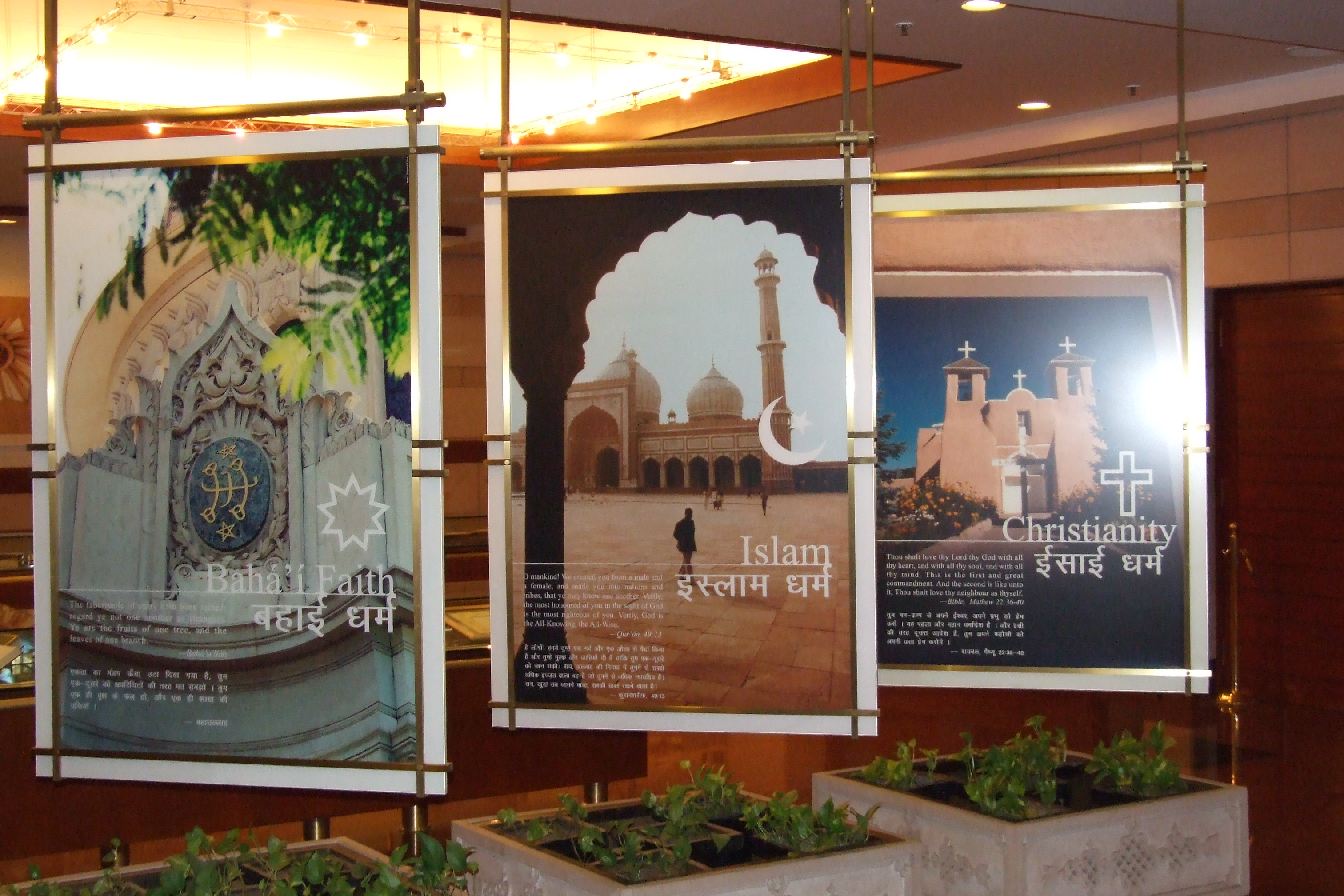
Displays at the information centre of the Lotus Temple in New Delhi, India

Baháʼís follow Baháʼu'lláh, a prophet whom they consider a successor to Zoroaster, Abraham, Moses, Jesus, Muhammad, Krishna and Buddha. This acceptance of other religious founders has encouraged some to regard the Baháʼí religion as a syncretic faith. However, Baháʼís and the Baháʼí writings explicitly reject this view. Baháʼís consider Baháʼu'lláh's revelation an independent, though related, revelation from God. Its relationship to previous dispensations is seen as analogous to the relationship of Christianity to Judaism. They regard beliefs held in common as evidence of truth, progressively revealed by God throughout human history, and culminating in (at present) the Baháʼí revelation. Baháʼís have their own sacred scripture, interpretations, laws and practices that, for Baháʼís, supersede those of other faiths.

== Call to the world's religious leaders ==
In 2002 the Universal House of Justice wrote a letter to the world's religious leaders, addressing the topic of inter-religious animosity, calling on all religious movements to "rise above fixed conceptions inherited from a distant past." In 2005 the document One Common Faith was published, primarily intended for a Baháʼí audience, in which it identifies as a major challenge for the Baháʼí community the inculcation of the principle of the oneness of religion and the overcoming of religious prejudices.

== See also ==
- Interfaith dialogue
- List of founders of religious traditions
- Table of prophets of Abrahamic religions
- World Religion Day
