= Baháʼí prophecies =

Future events prophesied in the Bahá'í writings

The writings of founding members of the Bahá'í Faith include prophetic statements of future events, some of which are viewed by Bahá'ís as having been fulfilled. According to Bahá'í belief, there have been individuals throughout history who were Manifestations of God, who founded major world religions and had certain supernatural powers, such as the ability to prophesy. The belief in fulfilled prophecies is presented by Bahá'í authors to demonstrate the validity of Bahá'u'lláh's claim to divinity.

Prominent among Bahá'í predictions of the future is a coming golden age of mankind, and the future appearance of another Manifestation of God. Among the predictions that Bahá'ís regard as fulfilled, Peter Smith summarizes: "the downfall of various world leaders; the loss of Ottoman territory; political revolution and popular rule in Iran; the twice-repeated sufferings of Germany; and what is interpreted as a reference to nuclear power. 'Abdu'l-Bahá also predicted the outbreak of World War I (originating in a Balkan conflict), and of a further global conflict in the future; the rise of communism; and racial conflict in the United States."

Most Bahá'í statements regarded as prophecies can be found in Bahá'u'lláh's tablets to the kings and rulers of the world and in the Kitáb-i-Aqdas.

== See also ==
- Bible prophecy
- New world order (Baháʼí)
- Progressive revelation (Baháʼí)
