= Table of prophets of Abrahamic religions =

This is an incomplete comparative table of prophets and messengers recognized across the Abrahamic religions and several related traditions.

Prophetic categories by tradition

- Judaism: The Hebrew Bible designates a canon of prophetic books (Nevi'im), but rabbinic literature (Talmud, Midrash) recognizes additional figures as prophets. The rabbis listed 48 male and 7 female prophets by name.
- Samaritanism: Samaritanism strictly recognizes Moses as the only "nabi" (law giving prophet). While patriarchal figures from Adam to Moses are venerated as recipients of a "pure chain" of divine wisdom and secrets, subsequent leaders like Joshua, Phinehas, or the scholar sage Marqah are regarded as authoritative guides and custodians of the Law, but do not hold the same legislative prophetic rank as Moses.
- Christianity: Prophetic recognition varies by denomination. While most traditions accept the Hebrew Bible prophets, the New Testament itself names additional prophets (Agabus, Anna the Prophetess, etc.). Some modern movements (e.g., Latter Day Saints) recognize a continuing line of prophets.
- Islam: Islamic theology distinguishes between a Nabi (who receives news from God) and a Rasul (a messenger sent with a specific law or book to a nation). Every rasul is a nabi, but not every nabi is a rasul. Traditionally, there are 124,000 nabis, of whom 313 are rusul. The Quran names 25 prophets; others are mentioned in Hadith or as Isra'iliyyat.
- Mandaeism: Mandaeism venerates a specific collection of chief prophets Adam, Shitil (Seth), Anōš (Enosh), Noah (Nú), Sam (Shem), and John the Baptist (Yahya). These figures are seen as protectors of the successive world ages. While these "Light Prophets" are honored, Mandaeism explicitly rejects figures like Abraham, Moses, and Jesus as "false prophets" (kadabiiia) or "deceivers" who deviated from the true Gnostic path (Nasiruta).
- Druze: The Druze tradition venerates a universal chain of spiritual guidance that includes biblical/Quranic prophets alongside Greek philosophers and other "immortal sages" (al ashraf), who are regarded as bearers of the same divine truth.
- Baháʼí Faith: The Baháʼí Faith views religions as part of a "progressive revelation" by Manifestations of God "Divine Educators" who reflect God's light like mirrors. This series includes Abraham, Moses, Krishna, Zoroaster, Buddha, Jesus, and Muhammad.
- Rastafari: The movement interprets the Hebrew Bible through an Afrocentric lens, viewing the African diaspora as the reincarnation of ancient Israel. Figures like Marcus Garvey are regarded as prophets, and Haile Selassie as a divine avatar called Jah.

== Table ==
| Prophets in Judaism | Samaritanism (Note: The Samaritan tradition venerates a chain of patriarchal ancestors from Adam to Moses as recipients of divine wisdom and the "Book of Signs," with Moses holding the unique rank of supreme law-giving prophet. Subsequent figures such as Joshua, Phinehas, and the scholar-sage Marqah are honored as authoritative leaders and interpreters (keepers of the "library"), but are not accorded the same legislative prophetic status as Moses.) | Prophets in Christianity | Prophets in Islam (Note: In this table, "Islam" refers to the mainstream Sunni and Shia consensus. Definitive nabi status requires attestation in the Quran or widely accepted hadith; biblical figures named only in tafsīr or narrative lore are discussed under Isra'iliyyat without repeating that qualifier in each cell.) | Chief Prophets of Mandaeism | Prophethood in the Druze faith (Note: The Druze tradition incorporated Neoplatonic philosophy into its theology. Greek thinkers such as Pythagoras, Plato, Aristotle, and Plotinus are venerated as bearers of universal spiritual truth, considered part of a universal chain of spiritual guidance.) | Manifestations in the Baháʼí Faith | Prophethood in the Rastafari faith (Note: Rastafari has no single formal prophets list; Rastas nonetheless venerate major Hebrew Bible figures (e.g. in Kebra Nagast). Modern figures (Marcus Garvey, Haile Selassie) are in the second table below.) |
|---|---|---|---|---|---|---|---|
| — | ʾĀ̊dā̊m | Adam | ʾĀdam | Adam | ʾĀdam | Ádam | — |
| — | — | Abel | Hābil (Revered as righteous) | — | — | — | — |
| — | Šåt | Seth | Shīth | Šītil | — | — | — |
| — | ʾĔnōš | Enos | — | Anōš (Ennosh) (pp. 26, 53, 56). | — | — | — |
| — | Qinā̊n | — | — | — | — | — | — |
| — | Măʾllēləl | — | — | — | — | — | — |
| — | Yărăd | — | — | — | — | — | — |
| — | ʾĪnūḵ | Enoch | Idris | — | ʾAḵnūḵ | Edrís (Enoch) | — |
| — | Mətušā̊ːlaʾ | — | — | — | — | — | — |
| — | Ləmēk | — | — | — | — | — | — |
| — | Nā̊ʾ | Noah | Nuh | Nú | Nuh | Núh | Noah |
| — | Šēm | Shem | — | Sam (Shem) | — | — | — |
| — | Šīlå | — | Salih | — | — | Sálih | — |
| — | Pălăg | — | — | — | — | — | — |
| — | Rəʿu | — | — | — | — | — | — |
| — | Šărūg | — | — | — | — | — | — |
| — | Nāʾūr | — | — | — | — | — | — |
| Abraham | ʾǍbrǎʾm | Abraham | ʾIbrāhīm | Abrahem (Rejected) (pp. 150–151). Mandaeans utilize the wordplay iahta (miscarriage) for the word jahutaiia (Jews) to mock practitioners of Abrahamic religions. | ʾIbrāhīm | Ibráhím | — |
| Sarah | — | — | Sarah | — | Sāra | — | — |
| — | Yišmaʿʾēl | Ishmael | Ismā'īl | — | — | Ismá‘íl | — |
| Isaac | Yēṣʾåq | Isaac | ʾIsḥāq | — | — | Isháq | — |
| Jacob | Yå̄ːqob | Jacob | Yaqub | — | Yaʾqob | Yaqúb | — |
| Joseph | Yūsef | Joseph (debated) | Yusuf | — | — | Yusúf | — |
| — | — | Lot | Lut | — | — | Lúta | — |
| Job | — | Job | Ayyub | — | Ayyūb | Ayyúb | — |
| — | Amram (ʾÅmrām) | — | Imran | — | — | — | — |
| — | — | Jethro | Shu'ayb | — | Shuʿayb | Shu'ayb | — |
| — | — | — | — | — | Akhenaten | — | — |
| Bithiah | — | — | — | — | — | — | — |
| Miriam | — | Miriam | — | — | — | — | Miriam |
| Aaron | Årron | Aaron | Harun | — | — | Harún | — |
| Moses | Moše | Moses | Musa | Mūsa (Rejected) (pp. 61, 150–151). Moses is viewed as a servant of the powers of darkness. | Mūsā | Musá | Moses |
| Joshua | Yēʾūša | Joshua | Yusha | — | — | — | — |
| — | — | — | al-Khidr (debated) | — | el-Khudar (Note: Druze venerate at least four prophets under the title el-Khudar ("the green one")...) | — | — |
| — | — | — | Luqman (debated) | — | — | — | — |
| Eldad | Ildåd | — | Eldad (debated) | — | — | — | — |
| Medad | Mūdåd | — | Medad (debated) | — | — | — | — |
| — | Caleb (Kīlåb) | — | — | — | — | — | — |
| Phinehas | Finahas | Phinehas | — | — | — | — | — |
| Deborah | — | Deborah | — | — | — | — | Deborah |
| Ruth | — | Ruth (debated; mainly Protestant discussion) | — | — | — | — | — |
| Gideon | — | Gideon (only Orthodox) | — | — | — | — | — |
| Eli | — | Eli | — | — | — | — | — |
| Elkanah | — | — | — | — | — | — | — |
| Hannah | — | — | — | — | — | — | — |
| Samuel | — | Samuel | Syamuil | — | — | — | Samuel |
| Gad | — | Gad | — | — | — | — | Gad |
| Nathan | — | Nathan | — | — | — | — | Nathan |
| King David | — | David | Dawud | — | — | "David" (Note: The Baháʼí Manifestation of God known as 'David' is not the same individual as King David. This David, according to Báb, lived before Moses.) | David |
| King Solomon | — | Solomon | Sulayman | — | Sulaymān | Sulaymān | Solomon |
| Jeduthun | — | Jeduthun | — | — | — | — | — |
| Asaph/Asoph | — | Asaph | — | — | — | — | — |
| Elijah | — | Elijah/Elias | Ilyas | — | el-Khudar | Élyás | Elijah |
| Elisha | — | Elisha | al-Yasa | — | — | — | — |
| Jonah | — | Jonah/Jonas | Yunus | — | — | Yúnus | — |
| Hosea | — | Hosea/Osee | Hushi' (Isra'iliyyat) | — | — | — | — |
| Amos | — | Amos | Amus (Isra'iliyyat) | — | — | — | — |
| Micah | — | Micheas | Miqah (Isra'iliyyat) | — | — | — | — |
| Obadiah | — | Obadiah | — | — | — | — | — |
| — | — | — | — | — | Pythagoras (Fīṯāḡūras) | — | — |
| Isaiah | — | Isaiah/Isaias | Ishaʻyā' | — | — | Íshiya | Isaiah |
| Jeremiah | — | Jeremiah/Jeremias | Irmiyā | — | — | Ermíya | Jeremiah |
| Zephaniah | — | Zephaniah/Sophonias | — | — | — | — | — |
| Joel | — | Joel | Yūʾīl (Isra'iliyyat) | — | — | — | — |
| — | — | — | — | — | Parmenides (Bārminīdes) | — | — |
| — | — | — | — | — | Empedocles (ʾAmbadūqlīs) | — | — |
| Nahum | — | Nahum | — | — | — | — | — |
| Huldah | — | Huldah | — | — | — | — | — |
| Habakkuk | — | Habakkuk/Habacuc | — | — | — | — | — |
| Ezra | — | Ezra | Uzair (debated) | — | — | — | — |
| Ezekiel | — | Ezekiel/Ezechiel | Dhul-Kifl | — | — | Za'l Kifl | Ezekiel |
| Uriah | — | Uriah | — | — | — | — | — |
| — | — | Daniel | Daniyal | — | — | Danyál | Daniel |
| — | — | — | — | — | al-Ya'fūrī | — | — |
| Haggai | — | Haggai | Hajaay (Isra'iliyyat) | — | — | — | — |
| Zechariah | — | Zechariah (the Prophet) | — | — | — | — | — |
| Malachi | — | Malachi | — | — | — | — | — |
| Mehseiah (Talmudic tradition) | — | — | — | — | — | — | — |
| Esther | — | — | — | — | — | — | — |
| — | — | Zechariah (the Priest) | Zakariya | — | — | — | — |
| — | — | Anna | — | — | — | — | — |
| — | — | Agabus | — | — | — | — | — |
| — | — | Agur (LXX; Greek Orthodox and similar) | — | — | — | — | — |
| — | — | — | Dhu al-Qarnayn (debated) | — | Alexander the Great (al-ʾIskandar / Dhu al-Qarnayn) | — | — |
| — | — | — | — | — | Aristotle (ʾArisṭūṭālīs) | — | — |
| — | — | — | — | — | Plato (ʾAflāṭūn) | — | — |
| — | — | — | — | — | Socrates (Suqrāṭ) | — | — |
| — | — | Mary (debated) (Note: Most Catholic and Eastern Orthodox traditions venerate Mary as a prophetess based on the Magnificat (Luke 1:46–55); most Protestant traditions do not formally classify her as a prophet.) | Maryam (Siddiqa; Ash'ari and Zahiri view: Prophetess) | — | — | — | — |
| — | — | John (the Baptist) | Yahya ibn Zakariyya | Yuhana Maṣbana | el-Khudar | Yúna | John the Baptist |
| — | — | Jesus Christ | Isa ibn Maryam (Jesus, son of Mary) | Ishu Mashiha (Rejected) (pp. 22, 168–169). Portrayed as a "fallen Mandaean" with "impure motives" and "hypocrisy." His baptism in the Jordan is considered a "counterfeit." | Isā ibn Yusuf and Maryam (Jesus, son of Joseph and Mary) | Jesus Christ | — |
| — | — | Luke the Evangelist | — | — | Luke the Evangelist (Lūqā) | — | — |
| — | — | Matthew the Apostle | — | — | Matthew the Apostle (Mattā) | — | — |
| — | — | Mark | — | — | Mark the Apostle (Marqus) | — | — |
| — | — | John of Patmos (except Syriac Orthodox Church) | — | — | — | — | — |
| — | — | Judas Barsabbas | — | — | — | — | — |
| — | — | Barnabas | — | — | — | — | — |
| — | — | Simeon Niger | — | — | — | — | — |
| — | — | Lucius of Cyrene | — | — | — | — | — |
| — | — | Manahen | — | — | — | — | — |
| — | — | Silas | — | — | — | — | — |
| — | — | Philip the Evangelist | — | — | — | — | — |
| — | — | — | — | — | Plotinus (ʾAflūṭīn) | — | — |
| — | — | — | — | — | Democrates | — | — |
| — | Marqah (Mårqe) | — | — | — | — | — | — |
| — | — | — | Muhammad | — | Muhammad | Muhammad | — |
| — | — | — | — | — | Salman al-Farsi | — | — |
| — | — | — | — | — | Ali | — | — |
| — | — | — | — | — | al-Hākim | — | — |
| — | — | — | — | — | Hamza (al-ʿAql, "the Intellect") | — | — |
| — | — | — | — | — | Muḥammad ibn Wahb al-Qurashī (al-Kalima, "the Word") | — | — |
| — | — | — | — | — | Abū'l-Khayr Salama ibn Abd al-Wahhab al-Samurri (al-Sābiq, "the Preceder") | — | — |
| — | — | — | — | — | Ismāʿīl ibn Muḥammad at-Tamīmī (al-Nafs, "the Soul") | — | — |
| — | — | — | — | — | Bahāʾ al-Dīn (al-Muqtana / al-Tālī, "the Follower") | — | — |
| — | — | — | — | — | Ad-Darazi | — | — |
| — | — | — | — | — | — | Deganawida (Native American Baháʼís) | — |
| — | — | — | — | — | — | Báb | — |
| — | — | — | — | — | — | Bahá'u'lláh | — |

== Prophets in modern and syncretic movements ==
This table lists figures regarded as prophets within movements that emerged in the modern era or incorporate elements of Abrahamic traditions alongside other beliefs. These figures are generally not recognized as prophets by mainstream Christianity, Islam, or Judaism. Deganawida is treated only in the main table (Baháʼí column) to avoid duplicating that row here.

| Name | Movement | Tradition of origin | Notes |
|---|---|---|---|
| Mirza Ghulam Ahmad | Ahmadiyya | Islam | Claimed to be the promised Messiah and Mahdi; regarded as a non-law-bearing prophet by Ahmadis. |
| Noble Drew Ali | Moorish Science | Islam/Syncretic | Founder of the Moorish Science Temple; considered a prophet by his followers. |
| Elijah Muhammad | Nation of Islam | Islam/Syncretic | Regarded as a messenger/prophet by the Nation of Islam; taught that God appeared in the person of Wallace Fard Muhammad. |
| Wallace Fard Muhammad | Nation of Islam | Islam/Syncretic | Regarded as God in person and a Great Messiah/Messenger by the Nation of Islam. |
| Rashad Khalifa | Submitters | Islam | Claimed to be the "Messenger of the Covenant"; rejected the Hadith and emphasized the "Code 19" in the Quran. |
| Krishna | Ahmadiyya | Hindu tradition | Regarded as a prophet by Ahmadis, who identify him as a "Manifestation of God" or a divinely inspired teacher. |
| Gautama Buddha | Ahmadiyya; Baháʼí Faith | Buddhist tradition | Regarded as a prophet by Ahmadis; also a Manifestation of God in Baháʼí teaching. |
| Zoroaster | Ahmadiyya; Baháʼí Faith | Zoroastrianism | Regarded as a prophet by Ahmadis; also recognized by Baháʼís as a Manifestation of God. Classical Islamic literature also occasionally discusses Zoroaster as a possible recipient of a revealed book. |
| Confucius | Ahmadiyya; Baháʼí Faith | Confucian tradition | Regarded as a prophet by Ahmadis; recognized among Baháʼí Manifestations as a preparatory figure. |
| Joseph Smith | Mormonism | Christianity | Founder of the Latter Day Saint movement, regarded as a prophet, seer, and revelator who restored the original church. |
| Hong Xiuquan | God Worshipping Society | Christianity | Primary religious leader and proclaimed Heavenly King of the God Worshipping Society founded by his associate Feng Yunshan, as well as military leader of the Taiping rebellion and head of state of the Taiping Heavenly Kingdom |
| Ellen G. White | Seventh-day Adventism | Christianity | Her writings are regarded as having the "Spirit of Prophecy" by the Seventh day Adventist Church. |
| Felix Manalo | Iglesia ni Cristo | Christianity | Regarded by his followers as the "Last Messenger of God in these Last Days" (Ang Sugo). |
| Marcus Garvey | Rastafari | Christianity/Pan-Africanism | Often regarded as a prophet or a "John the Baptist" figure by Rastafarians, foretelling the coronation of Haile Selassie. |
| Haile Selassie | Rastafari | Christianity/Ethiopic | Regarded as the return of Christ or God incarnate by Rastafarians. |
| Vernon Carrington | Twelve Tribes of Israel | Rastafari | Known as "Prophet Gad" founder of one of the major mansions of the Rastafari movement. |

== See also ==
- Books of the Bible
- List of burial places of Abrahamic figures
- List of founders of religious traditions

== Bibliography ==
- Buckley, Jorunn Jacobsen (2002). The Mandaeans: Ancient Texts and Modern People. Oxford University Press. ISBN 0-19-515385-5.
- Muhammad, Elijah (1965). Message to the Blackman in America. Muhammad's Temple No. 2.
- Ahmad, Mirza Ghulam. A Misconception Removed (Eik Ghalati Ka Izala). Islam International Publications.
- Bahá'u'lláh. Kitáb-i-Íqán (The Book of Certitude). Baháʼí World Centre.
- Crane, Oliver Turnbull (1890). The Samaritan Chronicle or The Book of Joshua the Son of Nun. New York.
- Gaster, Moses (1927). The Asatir: The Samaritan Book of the "Secrets of Moses". London: The Royal Asiatic Society.
- Häberl, Charles G.; McGrath, James F. (2020). The Mandaean Book of John: Text and Translation (PDF). De Gruyter. ISBN 978-3-11-048651-3.
- Macdonald, John (1963). Memar Marqah: The Teaching of Marqah. Berlin: Alfred Töpelmann.
- Noegel, Scott; Wheeler, Brannon (2010). The A to Z of Prophets in Islam and Judaism. Lanham, Maryland: Scarecrow Press. ISBN 9781461718956.
