= Marqah =

The Memar Marqah, or The teaching of Marqah, is a homiletic tractate on the Samaritan Torah composed in the 4th century by the sage Marke ben Amram ben Sared, a contemporary of Baba Rabba. The collection, written mostly in Samaritan Aramaic and partly in Samaritan Hebrew, is actually composed of six distinct works, which were compiled by later copyists into a single collection. Reference to this view can be found in the name given to it by later copyists, The Ark of Marqe, which indicates that the collection originated in a chest containing a selection of his writings found in Damascus. It was written in Samaritan Aramaic by the scholar, philosopher and poet Marqe in the 4th century. The work is a collection of midrashic compositions on several parts of the Torah, expanding its presentation of events and precepts with the purpose of examining its theological, didactic, and philosophical teachings. The Tibat Marqe consists of six volumes. The first five contain midrashim corresponding to the Torah. The last book has a different character and describes conversations between Moses and letters of the Torah.

== History ==
The original manuscripts have not survived. The only manuscripts are late 14th-century scribe copies found with the elders of the community in Shechem. Among the most important of these are the Kahel manuscript (MS H 1 at the University of Turin), and the Shechem manuscript preserved by the family of the Samaritan High Priest Amram ben Isaac. None of the manuscripts is complete, and missing fragments in the Nablus manuscript were discovered in 1995 in the Pirkowitz Collection.

== About the Author ==
Samaritan tradition attributes the composition to Marka, a great poet, and interprets his name as "Moses our Lord" in gematria, with the letter "sh" being split into "R" and "K" due to the sanctity of the name. According to modern research, his name is derived from the Roman name Marcus. He is called by the Samaritan community "Bedu'a Da'Chakmatah" "Founder of Wisdom", probably because of the Tibat Marqe. The Samaritan genealogy identifies Marka as the son of Amram ben Sared, one of the priests who were invited by Baba Rabba.

== Contents ==
The six books that make up the Ark of Marka are:

- Sefer Peliata (Peliata) - "The Book of Miracles", discusses the story of the Exodus and the Ten Plagues, and the character of Moses our rabbi.
- Al Tehumi Maa'an Eden - "Song of the Sea", various midrashim related to the subject of the crossing of the Red Sea and the Song of the Sea.
- And Moses and the Levitical Priests Spoke - discusses at length the parasha ("Kitza" according to the Samaritan division) of that name: Deuteronomy 27:9-20, and is concerned with a halakhic discussion in its nature in the details of the following commandments In the verses of the parsha.
- Shiratha Rabatha - A collection of sermons on the song of Haazinu.
- And there died Moshe the servant of the Lord' - A description of the passing of Moses
- The Twenty-Two Letters - A midrashic discussion of the meaning of the letters of the Paleo-Hebrew alphabet.

The Marka box contains linguistic layers from different periods, indicating later additions to the text, and there are speculations about early Arabic edits made to the text. The book itself deals with fundamental issues in the perception of religion, resurrection, and the Taheb and Day of Judgment, issues about which there was no general agreement in Marqe's own time. The book itself begins with confession and surrender to God and skips the creation stories of the Biblical Patriarchs straight to the Burning Bush.
