= Baháʼí perspective on international human rights =

Baháʼu'lláh, the prophet-founder of the Baháʼí Faith, called for global agreement on human rights protection nearly eighty years before the adoption of the Universal Declaration of Human Rights (UDHR) in 1948. He taught that "an equal standard of human rights must be recognized and adopted.” Baháʼu'lláh called for governments to protect the human rights of their populations and to ensure their welfare. To safeguard human rights, Bahá'u'lláh urged global leaders to establish a world commonwealth that would include a system of collective security to protect populations against tyranny and oppression.

== Divine basis for human rights ==
The Baháʼí Writings make clear that human rights are not merely a political or social concept that is contingent on recognition by governments. Rather, the Baháʼí perspective is that human rights exist with or without governments; indeed, they are a divine endowment flowing from the creation of all human beings with the potential to reflect the attributes of God. All human beings have for this reason an equal spiritual dignity. Accordingly, governments have a moral obligation to respect this divine endowment, an obligation that would exist even in the absence of treaties or customary legal norms obligating them to do so. Baháʼu'lláh impressed upon rulers this sacred duty: “For is it not your clear duty to restrain the tyranny of the oppressor, and to deal equitably with your subjects, that your high sense of justice may be fully demonstrated to all mankind? God hath committed into your hands the reins of the government of the people, that ye may rule with justice over them, safeguard the rights of the down-trodden, and punish the wrong-doers.” These are divinely ordained responsibilities that no government can legitimately shirk.

Bahá'u'lláh also teaches that because of this equal spiritual dignity, all human beings are members of a single human family that should be unified. This means that all should treat one another as brothers and sisters, and in turn honor and respect the rights of all other human beings, not only as co-equals, but as spiritual relatives. He declares, “Ye are the fruits of one tree, and the leaves of one branch.” Recognition of this fundamental connectedness is a precondition, according to the Baháʼí teachings, for the full realization of human rights. Baháʼu'lláh asserts in this connection: “The well-being of mankind, its peace and security, are unattainable unless and until its unity is firmly established.” Human Rights will remain no more than a morally admirable concept so long as they are not anchored in such an appreciation for human unity. That unity provides the impetus, the motivation, the will, to uphold and defend the rights of others. And it implies that human rights are the concern of everyone, not just governments.

== Background ==
The earliest use of the terminology of human rights in publications by Baháʼí institutions coincided with the inception of their official relationship with the United Nations. Three of the first four documents submitted to the newly established international organization in 1947 and 1948 were statements on various aspects of human rights intended as contributions to the preparatory work on the UDHR. The first of these was an eight-page statement entitled “A Baháʼí Declaration of Human Obligations and Rights” which was presented to the Human Rights Commission in February 1947 on behalf of eight national Baháʼí administrative bodies.

The Baháʼí International Community (BIC) explains that concern for human rights can be found throughout the Baháʼí Writings. Baháʼu'lláh, urged the rulers of the earth to “rule with justice ... safeguard the rights of the down-trodden, and punish the wrong-doers.” He taught that “there shall be an equality of rights and prerogatives for all mankind.”

Shoghi Effendi, the authorized interpreter of Bahaʼu'lláh's teachings, states that: “[t]he unity of the human race, as envisaged by Baháʼu'lláh, implies the establishment of a world commonwealth in which .... the autonomy of its state members and the personal freedom and initiative of the individuals that compose them are definitely and completely safeguarded. This commonwealth must, as far as we can visualize it, consist of a world legislature, whose members will, as the trustees of the whole of mankind, ultimately control the entire resources of all the component nations, and will enact such laws as shall be required to regulate the life, satisfy the needs and adjust the relationships of all races and peoples.”

Moreover, in The Promise of World Peace, the Universal House of Justice (the supreme governing institution of the Faith) underscores the importance of the UDHR and its related conventions, asserting that “all such measures, if courageously enforced and expanded, will advance the day when the specter of war will have lost its power to dominate international relations.”

Bahá'í views on human rights are based on the concept that every person is essentially a spiritual being endowed by the Creator with talents and capacities, and that the purpose of life is to realize that potential for the benefit of society as well as the individual concerned. The equal dignity of all human beings and the need for both solidarity and legal equality among them are clearly posited in many passages of the Baháʼí sacred scriptures. These ideas are encapsulated in the concept of the “oneness of mankind”, which is described as the “pivot round which all the teachings of Baháʼu'lláh revolve”.

== Illustrations of contributions to human rights issues by the Baháʼí community ==
The Baháʼí community plays an active role in enhancing a culture of human rights. Scores of statements on various aspects of human rights have been released since the presentation of “A Baháʼí Declaration of Human Obligations and Rights” in 1947. The Baháʼí community is dedicated to the integration of human rights in every aspect of global community life and favours education as the main approach to the promotion and protection of human rights.

=== Gender equality ===
Gender equality is a fundamental principle of the Baháʼí Faith. Bahaʼi belief states that the equality of the sexes is a spiritual and moral standard that is essential for the unification of the planet and the unfoldment of peace. The Baháʼí teachings note the importance of implementing the principle in individual, family, and community life. The BIC has released various statements on gender equality and particularly the role of women. In 1947, a statement entitled “Elimination of Discrimination Against women.” was presented to the 25th session of United Nations Commission on Human Rights on the Status of Women. As part of the statement, the BIC emphasized that the Baha'i Writings stress the principle of equality of education for men and women, as well as that of compulsory universal education, and elaborate the responsibilities of parents and of Baháʼí institutions to ensure equal opportunities in the education of children. In fact, it is stated that if parents are not able to educate both boy and girl, the girl should be given preference because she is the future mother and first educator of the child.

For the International Women's Year in 1975, the BIC released a pamphlet entitled “Equality of Men and Woman: A New Reality” which stated that equality of the sexes is, for Baháʼís, a spiritual and moral standard essential for the unification of the planet and the unfoldment of world order. Without the qualities, talents, and skills of both women and men, full economic and social development of the planet becomes impossible. For "[t]he world of humanity is possessed of two wings — the male and the female. So long as these two wings are not equivalent in strength the bird will not fly. Until womankind reaches the same degree as man, until she enjoys the same arena of activity, extraordinary attainment for humanity will not be realized; humanity cannot wing its way to heights of real attainment."

=== Eradicating poverty and rethinking prosperity ===
In a statement in 2008 entitled “Eradicating Poverty: Moving Forward as One”, the BIC offered two principles as guides for efforts in the realm of poverty eradication: justice and unity. They emphasised that these principles underlie a vision of development in which material progress serves as a vehicle for the moral and cultural advancement of humanity. Justice provides the means capable of harnessing human potential to eradicate poverty from our midst, through the implementation of laws, the adjustment of economic systems, the redistribution of wealth and opportunity, and unfailing adherence to the highest ethical standards in private and public life. Unity assures that progress is systemic and relational, that a concern for the integrity of the family unit and the local, national, and global community must guide poverty alleviation efforts.

Furthermore, in their contribution to the 18th session of United Nations Commission on Human Rights on sustainable development in 2010, Baháʼí International Community (BIC) challenged the assumption that human beings are slaves to self-interest and consumerism. In the statement “Rethinking Prosperity: Forging Alternatives to a Culture of Consumerism”, they state that the transition to sustainable consumption and production is part of a global enterprise which enables all individuals to fulfill their dual purpose, namely, to develop their inherent potentialities and to contribute to the betterment of the wider community. It is not enough to conceive of sustainable consumption and production in terms of creating opportunities for those living in poverty to meet their basic needs. Rather, with the understanding that each individual has a contribution to make to the construction of a more just and peaceful social order, these processes must be arranged in a way that permits each to play his or her rightful role as a productive member of society. Within such a framework, sustainable consumption and production could be characterized as processes that provide for the material, social and spiritual needs of humanity across generations and enable all peoples to contribute to the ongoing advancement of society.
