= God in the Baháʼí Faith =

Baháʼí conception of God

The Greatest Name is a Baháʼí symbol for God. It is the calligraphic rendering of the Arabic text: يا بهاء الأبهى, translated as "O Thou Glory of Glories".

The Baháʼí conception of God is of an "unknowable essence" who is the source of all existence and known through the perception of human virtues. The Baháʼí Faith follows the tradition of monotheism and dispensationalism, believing that God has no physical form, but periodically provides divine messengers in human form that are the sources of spiritual education. In another sense, Baháʼí teachings on God are also panentheistic, seeing signs of God in all things, but the reality of God being exalted and above the physical world.

Shoghi Effendi, head of the religion from 1921 to 1957, described God as "a personal God, unknowable, inaccessible, the source of all Revelation, eternal, omniscient, omnipresent and almighty".

According to Baháʼí teachings, God communicates his will and purpose for humanity through intermediaries known as Manifestations of God, who are the prophets and messengers who have founded religions throughout human history. Accepting these Manifestations allows individuals to draw nearer to God and attain spiritual progress.

Baháʼís do not believe God has any human or physical form; the use of male pronouns in Baháʼí scripture is by convention rather than implicating gender. Various names are used to refer to God in the writings, the one deemed greatest being "All-Glorious" or Bahá in Arabic.

== God ==
Baháʼís view God as the being responsible for the creation of all that exists. The teachings state there is only one God and that his essence is absolutely inaccessible from the physical realm of existence and that, therefore, his reality is completely unknowable. Thus, all of humanity's conceptions of God which have been derived throughout history are mere manifestations of the human mind and not at all reflective of his true nature.

While God's essence is inaccessible, a subordinate form of knowledge is available by way of mediation by divine messengers, known as Manifestations of God. The Manifestations of God reveal teachings that reflect God's will and purpose for humanity at a particular time in history. By recognising these Manifestations, humanity can fulfil its inherent purpose to know and love its creator. The Baháʼí teachings state that one can develop a closer relationship with God through prayer, study of the holy writings, development of praiseworthy qualities, and service to humanity.

Although human cultures and religions differ in their conceptions of God and his nature, Baháʼís believe they nevertheless refer to one and the same being. The differences, instead of being regarded as irreconcilable, are seen as purposefully reflective of the varying needs of the societies in which different religions were revealed. No single faith, and associated conception of God, is thus considered essentially superior to another from the viewpoint of its original social context; however, more recent religions may teach a more advanced conception of God as called for by the changing needs of local, regional or global civilization. Baháʼís thus regard the world's religions as chapters in the history of one single faith, revealed by God's Manifestations progressively and in stages. Baháʼu'lláh wrote:

All praise to the unity of God, and all honor to Him, the sovereign Lord, the incomparable and all-glorious Ruler of the universe, Who, out of utter nothingness, hath created the reality of all things, Who, from naught, hath brought into being the most refined and subtle elements of His creation, and Who, rescuing His creatures from the abasement of remoteness and the perils of ultimate extinction, hath received them into His kingdom of incorruptible glory. Nothing short of His all-encompassing grace, His all-pervading mercy, could have possibly achieved it.

While the Baháʼí writings teach of a personal god with faculties such as a mind, will, and purpose, they clearly state that this does not imply a human or physical form. Although God is referred to in scripture with masculine pronouns, this is by convention rather than an indication of gender. Shoghi Effendi, the head of the Baháʼí Faith in the first half of the 20th century, described God as inaccessible, omniscient, almighty, personal, and rational, and rejected pantheistic, anthropomorphic, and incarnationist beliefs.

== Manifestations of God ==
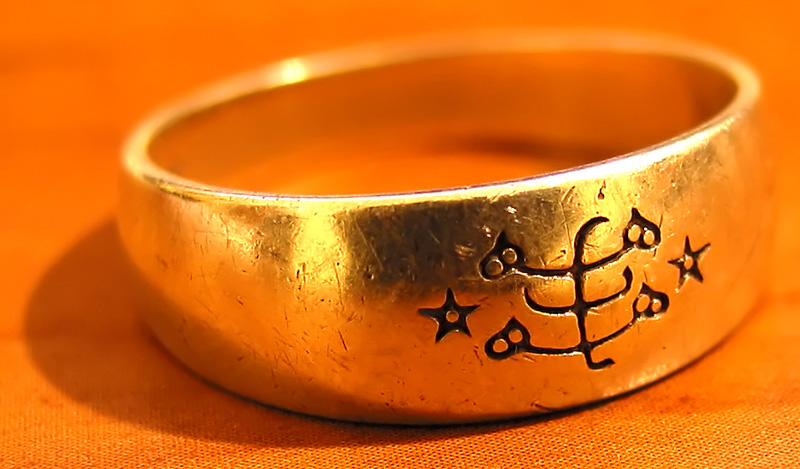
A ring engraved with the Ringstone Symbol, which symbolises the role of Manifestations in connecting God with his creation.

The Baháʼí teachings recognize the founders of the world's major religions as manifestations of the one same God, and regard them as the primary means of knowing God's attributes. Each revelation is thought to bring a greater degree of teachings and build upon those that came before, thus being essentially united in purpose. Several extant religions were mentioned by Baháʼu'lláh as being divinely revealed: Sabeanism (the religion of the Sabians), Hinduism, Zoroastrianism, Judaism, Buddhism, Christianity, and Islam. The divine origin of various other religions, that have since been lost to history, is assumed.

These Manifestations of God are regarded as mirrors that reflect God's divine attributes, revealing aspects of God without being incarnations. Through these educators, humans are able to attain spiritual progress and draw nearer to God.

== Names of God ==
The Baháʼí scriptures refer to God by various titles and attributes, such as Almighty, All-Powerful, All-Wise, Incomparable, Gracious, Helper, All-Glorious, Omniscient and All-Loving. Bahá'is believe the greatest of all the names of God is "All-Glorious" or Bahá in Arabic. Bahá is the root word of the following names and phrases: the greeting Alláh-u-Abhá (God is the All-Glorious), the invocation Yá Baháʼu'l-Abhá (O Thou Glory of the Most Glorious), Baháʼu'lláh (The Glory of God), and Baháʼí (Follower of the All-Glorious). These are expressed in Arabic regardless of the language in use (see Baháʼí symbols).

== See also ==
- Baháʼí Faith and the unity of religion
- Conceptions of God
- Ethical monotheism
- Existence of God
- God in Abrahamic religions
  - God in Christianity
    - God in Mormonism
    - Jehovah's Witnesses beliefs § God
  - God in Judaism
  - God in Islam
    - Sunni Islam § God
  - Druze § God
- Prayer in the Baháʼí Faith

== Bibliography ==
- Adamson, Hugh (2007). Historical Dictionary of the Baháʼí Faith. Oxford, UK: Scarecrow Press. ISBN 9780810864672.
- Effendi, Shoghi (1944). God Passes By. Wilmette, Illinois: Baháʼí Publishing Trust.
- Faizi, Abu'l-Qasim (2002). Conqueror of Hearts: Excerpts from Letters, Talks, and Writings of Hand of the Cause of God Abu'l-Qásim Faizí. Baháʼí Library Online.
- Fathea'zam, Hushmand (2002). The New Garden: An Introduction to the Bahá'í Faith. Juxta Publishing Limited. ISBN 9788185091556.
- Hatcher, William S.; Martin, Douglas (1985). The Baháʼí Faith (PDF). San Francisco: Harper & Row. ISBN 9780060637934.
- Hayes, Terril G.; Fisher, Betty J.; Hill, Richard A.; et al., eds. (2006) [1994]. The Journey of the Soul: Life, Death & Immortality. Baháʼí Publishing. ISBN 9781931847285.
- McLean, Jack; Lee, Anthony A. (1997), Revisioning the Sacred: New Perspectives on a Baha'i Theology, Kalimat Press, ISBN 0933770960
- Momen, Moojan (2003). "The God of Baháʼu'lláh". The Baha'i Faith and the World's Religions. Oxford, UK: George Ronald. pp. 1–38.
- Momen, Moojan (1997). A Short Introduction to the Bahá'í Faith. Oneworld. ISBN 9781851681204.
- Momen, Moojan (1988). Studies in Honor of the Late Husayn M. Balyuzi. Kalimat Press. pp. 185–217. ISBN 9780933770720.
- Smith, Peter (2008). An Introduction to the Baha'i Faith. Cambridge: Cambridge University Press. ISBN 9780521862516.
- Smith, Peter (2000). A Concise Encyclopedia of the Baháʼí Faith. Oxford, UK: Oneworld Press. ISBN 9781851681846.
- Stockman, Robert (2013). Baháʼí Faith: A Guide For The Perplexed. New York, NY: Bloomsbury Academic. ISBN 978-1-4411-8781-9.
- Momen, Moojan (2003). "The God of Baháʼu'lláh". The Baha'i Faith and the World's Religions. Oxford, UK: George Ronald. pp. 1–38.
