= Manifestation of God (Baháʼí Faith) =

Concept that refers to what are commonly called prophets

The Manifestation of God (Persian: مظهر ظهور, romanized: maẓhar ẓohūr) is a concept in the Baháʼí Faith that refers to what are commonly called prophets. The Manifestations of God are appearances of the Divine Spirit or Holy Spirit in a series of personages, and as such, they perfectly reflect the attributes of the divine into the human world for the progress and advancement of human morals and civilization through the agency of that same Spirit.

In the Baha'i Faith, it is believed that the Manifestations of God are the only channel for humanity to know about God because contact with the Spirit is what transforms the heart and mind, creating a living relationship between the soul and God. They act as perfect mirrors reflecting the attributes of God into the physical world. Baháʼí teachings hold that the motive force in all human development is due to the coming of the Manifestations of God. The Manifestations of God are directly linked with the Baháʼí concepts of progressive revelation and unity of religion.

== Station ==
The Ringstone symbol represents humanity's connection to God through the Manifestation of God

The Baháʼí concept of the intermediary between God and humanity is expressed in the term Manifestation of God. Baháʼís believe in a single, imperishable God, the creator of all things, including all the creatures and forces in the universe. Though inaccessible directly, God is nevertheless seen as conscious of his creation, with a mind, will and purpose. Baháʼís believe that God expresses this will at all times and in many ways, including through a series of divine messengers referred to as Manifestations of God. In expressing God's intent, these Manifestations are seen to establish religion in the world.

The Manifestations of God are not seen as incarnations of God as God cannot be divided and does not descend to the condition of his creatures, but they are also not seen as ordinary mortals. Instead, the Baháʼí concept of a Manifestation of God emphasizes the simultaneously existing qualities of humanity and divinity. In the station of divinity, they show forth the will, knowledge, and attributes of God; in the station of humanity, they show the physical qualities of common man. A common Baháʼí analogy used to explain the relationship between the Manifestation of God and God is that of a perfect mirror. In the analogy, God is likened to the Sun – the source of physical life on earth. The spirit and attributes of God are likened to the rays of the Sun, and the Manifestations of God are likened to perfect mirrors reflecting the rays of the Sun. Thus, the Manifestations of God act as pure mirrors that reflect the attributes of God onto this material world.

The Manifestations of God are seen to represent a level of existence which is an intermediary between God and humans. Baháʼu'lláh, the founder of the Baháʼí Faith, explained that at one extreme the Manifestations of God are humble servants of God and at the other extreme they claim to speak with the voice of God, and manifest his attributes to humanity. They may at times emphasize their humanity, and at other times proclaim their divinity. These stations are complementary rather than mutually exclusive.

The Manifestations of God are believed to possess capacities that do not exist in humans, and this difference is not a difference in degree but a difference in kind. The Manifestations of God are not seen to be simply great thinkers or philosophers who have a better understanding than others, but that, by their nature, they are inherently superior to the average human. Thus, the Manifestations of God are special beings, having a unique relationship to God as they have been sent by God from the spiritual world as an instrument of divine revelation. They are understood to have existed in the spiritual world prior to their physical birth in this life. They are also seen to have innate, divinely revealed knowledge and absolute knowledge of the physical world. According to ʻAbdu'l-Bahá, the son and successor of the founder of the Baháʼí Faith, the Manifestations of God must be distinguished above any other person in every aspect and qualification, in order that they can effectively train and educate people.

In his book The Messiah of Shiraz, Denis MacEoin noted a possible discrepancy between the contemporary Baháʼí understanding of Baháʼu'lláh's station as a Manifestation of God and that found in Baháʼu'lláh's own works. Specifically, he contrasted the "official modern Bahāʾī doctrine reject[ing] any notion of incarnationism and stress[ing] instead his status as a locus of divine manifestation [...] comparable to a mirror with respect to the sun," to several quotes from the writings of Baháʼu'lláh, which he argued are suggestive of a more radical interpretation.

== Purpose ==
The purpose of the Manifestation of God, according to Baháʼí belief, is to educate humanity. The Manifestations of God are seen as divine educators, who are raised up by God with the purpose of uplifting mankind and expressing his will. In expressing God's intent, the Manifestations of God are seen to establish religion in the world. Each brings a book and reveals teachings and laws according to the time and place which they appear. Baháʼu'lláh used the term revelation to describe the phenomena that occurs each time a Manifestation of God appears; he stated that the writings of the Manifestation of God represent the infallible word of God, and because the writings remain after the earthly life of the Manifestation they are a very important part of revelation. The laws and precepts revealed by the Manifestation of God lie in different spheres and levels and include elements intended to help individuals develop a sound character and acquire divine attributes, as well as laws and principles designed to help improve the welfare of society and advance civilization. ʻAbdu'l-Bahá has stated that from time to time an educator will come to teach humanity, and without these teachings humanity would be overcome by such emotions and attitudes as anger, jealousy and hatred.

The Baháʼí belief that the primary role of the Manifestation of God is that of an educator is stated by Baháʼu'lláh and ʻAbdu'l-Bahá:

"The Prophets and Messengers of God have been sent down for the sole purpose of guiding mankind to the straight Path of Truth. The purpose underlying their revelation hath been to educate all men, that they may, at the hour of death, ascend, in the utmost purity and sanctity and with absolute detachment, to the throne of the Most High. The light which these souls radiate is responsible for the progress of the world and the advancement of its peoples. They are like unto leaven which leaveneth the world of being, and constitute the animating force through which the arts and wonders of the world are made manifest. Through them the clouds rain their bounty upon men, and the earth bringeth forth its fruits. All things must needs have a cause, a motive power, an animating principle. These souls and symbols of detachment have provided, and will continue to provide, the supreme moving impulse in the world of being."

"God sent all His Prophets into the world with one aim, to sow in the hearts of men love and goodwill, and for this great purpose, they were willing to suffer and to die. All the sacred Books were written to lead and direct man into the ways of love and unity; and yet, in spite of all this, we have the sad spectacle of war and bloodshed in our midst."

== Equality ==
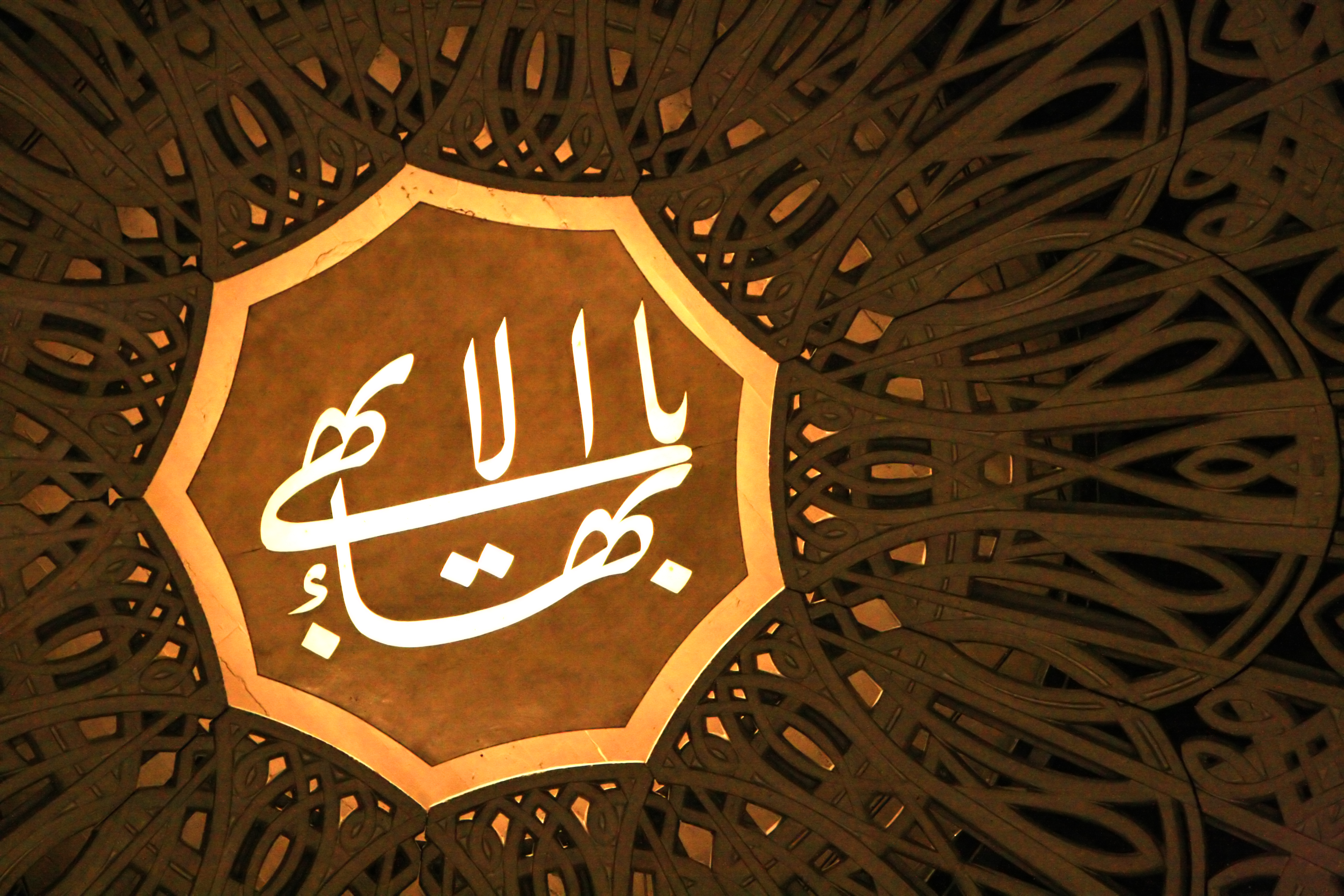
The calligraphy of the Greatest Name on a metal plate at the top of the interior of the Baháʼí House of Worship in Wilmette, Illinois.

In the Baháʼí Faith, all of the Manifestations of God are sent from the same God and have the same spiritual and metaphysical nature, and that there is absolute equality among them. The differences between the various Manifestations of God and their teachings, Baháʼu'lláh explained, are due to the varying needs and capacities of the civilization in which they appeared, and not due to any differences in their level of importance or nature.

The Manifestations of God are taught to be "one and the same", and in their relationship to one another have both the station of unity and the station of distinction. Baháʼu'lláh wrote in the Book of Certitude that in respect to their station of unity "if thou callest them all by one name and dost ascribe to them the same attribute, thou hast not erred from the truth." In this sense, the Manifestations of God all fulfill the same purpose and perform the same function by mediating between God and creation. In this way each Manifestation of God manifested the Word of God and taught the same religion, with modifications for the particular audience's needs and culture. Baháʼu'lláh wrote that since each Manifestation of God has the same divine attributes, they can be seen as the spiritual "return" of all the previous Manifestations of God.

Baháʼu'lláh then states the diversity of the teachings of the Manifestations of God does not come about because of their differences, since they are one and the same, but because they each have a different mission. Baháʼu'lláh writes regarding this station of distinction, "each Manifestation of God hath a distinct individuality, a definitely prescribed mission, a predestined Revelation, and specially designated limitations." Baháʼu'lláh wrote in the Gems of Divine Mysteries that those who perceive distinctions and differences between the Manifestations of God, will notice the underlying unity of the Manifestations once they continue on their spiritual path. Baháʼu'lláh in several passages goes so far as to say that denial of one Manifestation is equivalent to denial of all of them. ʻAbdu'l-Bahá said that a Baháʼí will choose death over denial of any of the great Prophets, whether Moses, Muhammad or Christ.

The Baháʼí belief in the oneness of the Manifestations of God does not mean, however, that the same individual soul is born again at different times and in different physical bodies. In the Baháʼí Faith, the various Manifestations of God were all different personalities and had separate individual realities. Instead, their equality is due to that Manifestation of God manifested and revealed the qualities of God to the same degree.

== Religious perennialism ==
Baháʼu'lláh taught that Manifestations have always been sent by God, and always will, as part of the single progressive religion from God bringing more teachings through time to help humanity progress. In the Baháʼí view the succession of Manifestations of God had no beginning and will have no end. Shoghi Effendi, the head of the Baháʼí Faith in the first half of the 20th century, stated that Manifestations will continue to come about every thousand years, extending "over many ages into the unborn reaches of time."

While Manifestations of God are explained to have always come to humanity and will continue to do so, ʻAbdu'l-Bahá explained that there are distinct cycles within this process. The cycles consist of hundreds of thousands of years and are characterized by three periods. The first period involves the coming of a series of Manifestations of God who prepare humanity for a universal theophany; the second period involves the appearance of the Manifestation of God that brings the universal theophany and his dispensation; finally the third period includes the Manifestations of God that come after. ʻAbdu'l-Bahá stated that in the current cycle, the first period was started by Adam and extended to the time of the Báb. Baháʼu'lláh is seen as the universal Manifestation of God, and the current cycle will continue for another 500,000 years.

Baháʼís do not claim that the Baháʼí revelation is the final stage in God's direction in the course of human spiritual evolution. The Baháʼí writings contain assurances that at least after 1000 years of Baháʼu'lláh's coming, another Manifestation of God will appear to advance human civilization.

ʻAbdu'l-Bahá writes in the Tablet of the Universe ("Lawh-i-Aflákiyyih") that there are infinite Manifestations of God in the infinite worlds of God.

== Minor prophets ==
In the Baháʼí definition, there is a distinction between minor prophets and the Manifestations of God, the major prophets. This distinction is also referred to as lesser/greater, dependent/independent, follower/universal, and other similar phrases. The Manifestations of God or the major prophets are compared to the sun, which produces its own heat and light, and the minor prophets are likened to the moon, which receives its light from the sun.

The Manifestations of God are described as prophets endowed with constancy. The term endowed with constancy refers to prophets to whom a book was revealed (in which the book contained legislation) and with whom lasting covenants with God were made, abrogating past covenants. For example, Baháʼu'lláh describes Moses as a Manifestation of God and his brother Aaron a minor prophet; Moses spoke on behalf of God, and Aaron spoke on behalf of Moses (Exodus 4:14–17).

The distinction can also be described as the difference between inspiration and revelation. Revelation is seen to be the direct and infallible perception of God's word and is only accessible to the Manifestations of God who transmit it to humanity. On the other hand, inspiration is seen to be the indirect and relative perception of spiritual truths that each person may have access to. Baháʼu'lláh stated that at times, God chooses ordinary people to act as prophets and thus inspires them to play certain roles in human affairs; these people however remain ordinary people whose powers of inspiration have been further developed by God.

== Other possible divine teachers ==
It is implied, though not specifically stated, that the American continents have had their share of divine revelations, which somewhat have been lost to time except in oral traditions. A quote exists by 'Abdu'l-Bahá:

In ancient times the people of America were, through their northern regions, close to Asia, that is, separated from Asia by a strait. For this reason, it hath been said that crossing had occurred. There are other signs which indicate communication. As to places whose people were not informed of the appearance of Prophets, such people are excused. In the Qur'án it hath been revealed: "We will not chastise them if they had not been sent a Messenger" (Q. 17:15). Undoubtedly in those regions, the Call of God must have been raised in ancient times, but it hath been forgotten now.

Academics are researching Native Messengers and some have connected the signs of a Prophet with the Great Peacemaker of the Haudenosaunee. As such, some Baháʼí's revere the Peacemaker as a Manifestation of God. However, as the Great Peacemaker was never named specifically in the Writings, he cannot be officially listed as a Manifestation of God within the Baháʼí Faith.

In regards to the Asiatic prophets, Shoghi Effendi wrote:

The only reason there is not more mention of the Asiatic Prophets is because Their names seem to be lost in the mists of ancient history. Buddha is mentioned, and Zoroaster, in our Scriptures – both non-Jewish Prophets or non Semitic Prophets. We are taught there always have been Manifestations of God, but we do not have any record of Their names.

Joseph Smith, the Prophet of the Mormon religion founded around the same time as the Baha'i, is not officially recognised as a Manifestation of God or as a minor prophet, but is thought to have spoken of the coming of Baháʼu'lláh.

== Known messengers ==
There is no definitive list of Manifestations of God, but Baháʼu'lláh and ʻAbdu'l-Bahá referred to several personages as Manifestations; they include: Zoroaster, Krishna, Gautama Buddha, all the Jewish prophets, Adam, Noah, Abraham, Moses, Jesus, Muhammad, the Báb, and ultimately Baháʼu'lláh. Thus, religious history is interpreted in the Baháʼí Faith as a series of periods or "dispensations", where each Manifestation brings a somewhat broader and more advanced revelation, suited for the time and place in which it was expressed. Furthermore, the other prophets of the Old Testament such as Jeremiah, David, Solomon, Ezekiel, and Isaiah are described as minor prophets as they came in the shadow of the dispensation of Moses to develop and consolidate the process he set in motion. There is, however, no definite list of who is or is not a minor prophet in the Baháʼí understanding.

Table of the known messengers of God in Baháʼí Faith
Baháʼí name	Also known as	Also venerated in
Ádam	Adam	Christianity, Islam, Druze Faith, Mandaeism
Edrís	Enoch	Christianity, Islam, Judaism
Núh	Noah	Christianity, Islam, Judaism, Druze Faith, Mandaeism, Yazidism
Krís͟hna	Krishna	Hinduism, Jainism, Islam (only Ahmadiyya)
Húd	Hud	Islam
Sálih	Saleh	Islam
Zoroaster	Zoroaster	Zoroastrianism, Manichaeism, Mithraism, Islam (only Ahmadiyya)
Ibráhím	Abraham	Christianity, Islam, Judaism, Druze Faith
Lúta	Lot	Christianity, Islam, Judaism
Ismá‘íl	Ishmael	Islam, Judaism
Isháq	Isaac	Christianity, Islam, Judaism
Yaqúb	Jacob	Christianity, Islam, Judaism
Yusúf	Joseph	Christianity, Islam, Judaism
Ayyúb	Job	Christianity, Islam, Judaism, Druze Faith
Shu'ayb	Shuaib	Islam, Druze Faith
Harún	Aaron	Christianity, Islam, Judaism, Samaritanism
Musá	Moses	Christianity, Islam, Judaism, Druze Faith
Yus͟hi‘	Joshua	Christianity, Islam, Judaism
"Prophet of the Sabaeans"		–
Dávúd	David	Christianity, Islam, Judaism
Sulaymān	Solomon	Christianity, Islam, Judaism
Élyás	Elijah	Christianity, Islam, Judaism, Druze Faith
Yúnus	Jonah	Christianity, Islam, Judaism
Búdá	Buddha	Buddhism, Hinduism
Íshiya	Isaiah	Christianity, Islam, Judaism
Ermíya	Jeremiah	Christianity, Islam, Judaism
Za'l Kifl	Ezekiel	Christianity, Islam, Judaism
Zakariyá	Zechariah	Christianity, Islam, Judaism
Yu'íl	Joel	Christianity, Islam, Judaism
Danyál	Daniel	Christianity, Islam, Judaism
Yúna	John the Baptist	Christianity, Islam, Mandaeism, Druze Faith
‘Ísá	Jesus	Christianity, Islam, Druze Faith, Manichaeism
Muḥammad	Muhammad	Islam, Druze Faith
Báb		Bábism, Azalism
Baháʼu'lláh		–

== See also ==
- Abrahamic Religions
- Baháʼí Faith and the unity of religion
- Buddhahood
- Culture hero
- Dashavatara
- List of founders of religious traditions
- Messiah
- Manifestation of God
- Perennial philosophy
- Saoshyant
- Sidrat al-Muntaha
- Son of Heaven
- Table of prophets of Abrahamic religions
