= Progressive revelation (Baháʼí) =

Baháʼí doctrine that religious truth is revealed by God progressively

Progressive revelation is a core teaching in the Baháʼí Faith that suggests that religious truth is revealed by God progressively and cyclically over time through a series of divine Messengers, and that the teachings are tailored to suit the needs of the time and place of their appearance. Thus, the Baháʼí teachings recognize the divine origin of several world religions as different stages in the history of one religion, while believing that the revelation of Baháʼu'lláh is the most recent (though not the last—that there will never be a last), and therefore the most relevant to modern society.

This teaching is an interaction of simpler teachings and their implications. The basic concept relates closely to Baháʼí views on God's essential unity, and the nature of prophets, termed Manifestations of God. It also ties into Baháʼí views of the purpose and nature of religion, laws, belief, culture and history. Hence revelation is seen as both progressive and continuous, and therefore never ceases.

== Progressive cycles ==
=== Dispensations ===
Baháʼís believe God to be generally regular and periodic in revealing His will to mankind through messengers/prophets, which are named Manifestations of God. Each messenger in turn establishes a covenant and founds a religion. This process of revelation, according to the Baháʼí writings, is also never ceasing, which is contrary to many other belief systems that believe in a finality of their prophet/messenger. The general theme of the successive and continuous religions founded by Manifestations of God is that there is an evolutionary tendency, and that each Manifestation of God brings a larger measure of revelation (or religion) to humankind than the previous one. The differences in the revelation brought by the Manifestations of God is stated to be not inherent in the characteristics of the Manifestation of God, but instead attributed to the various worldly, societal and human factors; these differences are in accordance with the "conditions" and "varying requirements of the age" and the "spiritual capacity" of humanity. These differences are seen to be needed since human society has slowly and gradually evolved through higher stages of unification from the family to tribes and then nations.

Thus religious truth is seen to be relative to its recipients and not absolute; while the messengers proclaimed eternal moral and spiritual truths that are renewed by each messenger, they also changed their message to reflect the particular spiritual and material evolution of humanity at the time of the appearance of the messenger. In the Baháʼí view, since humanity's spiritual capacity and receptivity has increased over time, the extent to which these spiritual truths are expounded changes.

Baháʼu'lláh, the founder of the Baháʼí Faith, explained that the appearance of successive messengers was like the annual coming of Spring, which brings new life to the world which has come to neglect the teachings of the previous messenger. He also used an analogy of the world as the human body, and revelation as a robe of "justice and wisdom".

Whenever this robe hath fulfilled its purpose, the Almighty will assuredly renew it. For every age requireth a fresh measure of the light of God. Every Divine Revelation hath been sent down in a manner that befitted the circumstances of the age in which it hath appeared.

Baháʼu'lláh mentioned in the Kitáb-i-Íqán that God will renew the "City of God" about every thousand years, and specifically mentioned that a new Manifestation of God would not appear within 1000 years of Baháʼu'lláh's message.

Muhammad, Jesus, Moses, and Zoroaster were all named by Baháʼu'lláh as being among the establishers of religion, termed Manifestations of God, as well as himself, and his forerunner the Báb. Baháʼu'lláh also expressly or implicitly referred to Adam, Noah, Saleh, Húd, and an unnamed prophet of the Sabians as messengers of God. Bahà'u'llàh's works that exist today never mentioned Buddha or Krishna as manifestations, but his son 'Abdu'l-Bahà mentioned in his own works that Buddha and Krishna were indeed manifestations of God.

=== Universal cycles ===
In addition to the idea of religion being progressively revealed from the same God through different prophets/messengers, there also exists in Baháʼí literature, the idea of a universal cycle, which represents a series of dispensations, and is used to categorize human history and social evolution in a number of ways. It is viewed as a superset of the sequence of progressive revelations, and currently comprises two cycles.

The Adamic cycle, also known as the Prophetic cycle, is stated to have begun approximately 6,000 years ago with a Manifestation of God referred to in various sacred scriptures as Adam, and ended with the dispensation of Muhammad. In this cycle, Baháʼí belief is that Manifestations of God continued to advance human civilization at regular intervals through progressive revelation. The Abrahamic religions and Dharmic religions are partial recognitions of this cycle, from a Baháʼí point of view.

In Baháʼí belief, the Baháʼí cycle, or Cycle of Fulfillment, began with the Báb and includes Baháʼu'lláh, and will last at least five hundred thousand years with numerous Manifestations of God appearing throughout that time. It is stated in Baháʼí literature that the Manifestations of God in the Adamic cycle, in addition to bringing their own teachings, foretold of the Cycle of Fulfillment.

== Metaphors ==
The concept of progressive revelation is further explained in the Baháʼí writings in numerous metaphors. These metaphors include the daily and seasonal cycle and the progression through a school.

=== Daily and seasonal cycles ===
The coming of each new messenger and the teachings they bring is compared to the coming of Spring, as the teachings bring new life to the world made spiritually dead and cold because the teachings of the previous messenger have been neglected. The coming of the messenger is also described through the metaphor of daily cycle of the sun. The appearance of the Manifestation of God is here likened to the rise of the spiritual sun. The teachings of this messenger then extend and deepen towards noon and afternoon but as the sun sets the teachings are not as visible.

=== Religion as a school ===
The earliest forms of religion are seen, in many of the Baháʼí Writings, to be like early school. In this view humanity, like a child, has been maturing while gaining a greater ability to grasp complex ideas as it grows in years and progresses in school. Each time a divine messenger appears, the message given is suited to humanity's degree of maturation. In this view each religion may explain truth differently according to the needs of the recipients of the teachings. Baháʼu'lláh was asked several questions about the nature of differences in religions, God's messengers, and religious laws. His response was a reference to progressive revelation:

The All-Knowing Physician hath His finger on the pulse of mankind. He perceiveth the disease, and prescribeth, in His unerring wisdom, the remedy. Every age hath its own problem, and every soul its particular aspiration. The remedy the world needeth in its present-day afflictions can never be the same as that which a subsequent age may require. Be anxiously concerned with the needs of the age ye live in, and centre your deliberations on its exigencies and requirements.

== Religious truth is of two kinds ==
Baháʼís believe that religious teachings are of two varieties: essential spiritual truth, and ephemeral social constructs. The latter may include laws of conduct, diet, institutions, ceremonies, and treatment of criminals. These may change dramatically from messenger to messenger. The former, however, are essential and do not change, except perhaps in their cultural presentation. So the Manifestation of God is seen as at once restoring the essential truth, returning the faithful to the correct practice. Simultaneously, the Manifestation eliminates redundant or corrupt social structures and creates such social organization as will support the improvement of mankind.

== Types of religions and religious founders ==
Baháʼís accept the founders of the "major world religions" as Manifestations of God. The usual list Baháʼís commonly refer to include Krishna, Buddha, Zoroaster (Zarathustra), Abraham, Moses, Jesus, Muhammad, the Báb, and Baháʼu'lláh. In addition to the Manifestations of God, the Baháʼí writings include a category of lesser prophets who reflect the light of the Manifestations, but are not independent divine intermediaries; there is no definitive list of lesser prophets.

The Baháʼí writings also refer to some other figures who are not well known, or whose religions have all but disappeared. Furthermore, the existence of unnumbered previous religions of which we have no modern knowledge is confirmed by Shoghi Effendi:

"These religions are not the only true religions that have appeared in the world, but are the only ones still existing. There have always been divine Prophets and Messengers, to many of whom the Qur'án refers. But the only ones existing are those mentioned above."

== Establishing texts ==
In the Kitáb-i-Íqán (in English, The Book of Certitude), Baháʼu'lláh describes the relationships between several Abrahamic prophets and how each accepted the previous, but was rejected by the previous prophet's followers. He uses these examples to highlight the legitimacy of the Báb to the reader, since the book was written in answer to some questions from the Báb's uncle.

== See also ==
- Baháʼí Faith and science
- Baháʼí Faith and the unity of humanity
- Baháʼí Faith and the unity of religion
- Baháʼí prophecies
- Compare: Dispensationalism, Historical materialism
- List of founders of religious traditions
- Table of prophets of Abrahamic religions
