= Tabernacle (disambiguation) =

The Tabernacle (משכן), or Tent of the Convocation (Heb. אוהל מועד) according to the Book of Exodus, was a movable tent and worship facility used by the Israelites.

Tabernacle may also refer to:

== Generic religious terms ==
- Church tabernacle, a small cupboard, chest, or cabinet in which the consecrated hosts are kept
- Tabernacle (Methodist), the centre of a camp meeting, includes a gallery with locations
- Tabernacle (LDS Church), a multipurpose building used for worship and as a community center by Mormons.
- Tabernacle societies, lay Eucharistic Adorative associations within Roman Catholic parishes, principally in America and Australia
- Tabernacle, a name for a local church (disambiguation)
- Tin tabernacle, common name for church and related buildings made of corrugated iron
- Aedicula or tabernacle, a nook or frame intended for a tabernacle shrine
- The biblical Jewish holiday named Sukkot, or the Feast of Tabernacles.

== Particular religious buildings ==
=== Israel ===
- Temple in Jerusalem, the successor to the moveable Jewish Tabernacle (משכן) erected by the Israelites in early Jerusalem

=== United Kingdom ===
==== England ====
- Metropolitan Tabernacle, a large Reformed Baptist church in the Elephant and Castle in London

==== Wales ====
- Tabernacle Chapel, Abercynon, Rhondda Cynon Taf (Presbyterian Church of Wales)
- Tabernacle Chapel, Aberdare, Rhondda Cynon Taf (Congregational)
- In Cardiff:
  - Tabernacle Chapel, Cardiff city centre (Baptist)
  - Tabernacle Chapel, Roath (Independent)
  - Tabernacle Chapel, Whitchurch (Presbyterian Church of Wales)
- Tabernacle Chapel, Llandovery, Carmarthenshire (Presbyterian Church of Wales)
- Tabernacle Chapel, Llanelli, Carmarthenshire (Independent)
- Tabernacle Chapel, Morriston, Swansea (Independent)
- Tabernacle Chapel, Ynysybwl, Rhondda Cynon Taf, Wales (Independent)

=== United States ===
- The Tabernacle (Scottsville, Kentucky)
- Aquarian Tabernacle Church, a Wiccan church located in Index, Washington
- Dime Tabernacle, the fourth Seventh-day Adventist church to be built in Berrien Springs, Michigan
- Salt Lake Tabernacle, a religious meeting building in Salt Lake City, Utah, also known as the Mormon Tabernacle
- Whitefield's Tabernacle (disambiguation), name of several churches

== Other buildings and venues ==
- The Tabernacle, Notting Hill, an arts venue in London, England
- The Tabernacle, Machynlleth, an arts venue in Machynlleth, Powys, Wales
- Tabernacle (concert hall), a concert venue in Atlanta, Georgia, United States
- The Tabernacle, a spectators' building at Mote Park, in Maidstone, Kent, England
- Central Pentecostal Tabernacle, former home of the North Pointe Community Church, Edmonton, Alberta, Canada

== Places ==
- Tabernacle, Alabama, United States
- Tabernacle Township, New Jersey, United States
- Tabernacle, Virginia, United States

== Art, entertainment, and media ==
- "Tabernacle", an artificial intelligence from the film Zardoz
- "Tabernacle", a song from Layers (Royce da 5'9" album)
- Tabernacle at Pendrell Vale, a Magic: The Gathering card
- Bourbon Tabernacle Choir, a rock band from Toronto

== Education ==
- Tabernacle Christian Academy, a Christian school in Poughkeepsie, New York, United States
- Tabernacle Christian School, a private Christian School in Gardendale, Alabama, United States
- Tabernacle School District, a community public school district Tabernacle Township, in Burlington County, New Jersey, United States

== Other ==
- Tabernacle of Unity, 2006 Bahá'í book
- Tabernacle (sailing), the frame on which the heel of a detachable or folding mast is mounted
- Quebec French profanity, the most used and strongest French language profanity in Canada
