= Baháʼí Esperanto League =

Organization of Esperantist Baháʼís

The Baháʼí Esperanto League (BEL) is the official organization of Baháʼís who are Esperantists. It was founded on 19 March 1973 with the approval of the Universal House of Justice.

== The Baháʼí Faith and Esperanto ==
The Baháʼí Faith advocates the introduction of an international auxiliary language which, together with the mother tongue, would be taught in all the schools of the world (see Baháʼí Faith and auxiliary language). This is one of the prerequisites of Baháʼu'lláh for the unification of mankind, the establishment of lasting peace and the advancement of human culture.

Thus it is not surprising that the relationship of the Baháʼí community to the Esperanto movement has a long history. Esperanto was highly praised by ʻAbdu'l-Bahá. From the time of its introduction until the present time, many Baháʼís have learned the language and actively supported the Esperanto movement.

Baháʼu'lláh has left it to the governments of the world to decide upon the question of a common script and to choose the international language from among the existing national tongues or to create a new language specially for this purpose. For this reason Baháʼís tend to place emphasis on the urgency of introducing such a language rather than giving direct support to Esperanto or to any other one language.

Bahaʼu'lláh himself in the Sixth Ishraq calls on the Universal House of Justice to decide the language question: “In former epistles We have enjoined upon Trustees of the House of Justice either to choose one language from among those now existing or to adopt a new one…” And, this institution itself in its letter of 8 June 1980 has expanded: “On the one hand this task is given to the governments of the world, on the other it is given to the House of Justice.” The selection question is probably ergo a process in at least two parts resting with – (1) the supreme governing body of the Bahaʼis of the world (Haifa) and (2) as stated on the last page of the Kitab-i-Aqdas with the parliaments of the world.

The next sentence of that 1980 letter explains: "It is not possible now to see how this will come about..." ʻAbdu'l-Baha asked 'every one of us to study Esperanto' whether or not it becomes universal and how Shoghi Effendi interpreted that as 'repeated and emphatic admonitions of ʻAbdu'l-Bahá.' The language question however, is similar to what the essence of religion has ever been - a spiritual and mystical matter over and above any intellectual dimension. When this overarching Bahaʼi principle is systematically and widely consulted on this process will be better understood and disputes re the selection question avoided because whether English will remain dominant or whether Mandarin will become dominant are as ephemeral questions as which national language of the 19th century was dominant. Such disputes will evaporate when the principle of a universal auxiliary language is properly discussed and understood.

== The Baháʼí Esperanto League ==
In the 1920s and 30s certain notable Baháʼís such as Martha Root, Lidia Zamenhof and Hermann Grossmann — the founder of the Baháʼí Esperanto magazine La Nova Tago — were active in the Esperanto movement. After the Second World War, the office of the Baháʼí International Community in Geneva was able to continue this activity, but only for a few years. In the 1950s and 60s the task was again taken over by individuals such as Adelbert Mühlschlegel and Roan Orloff-Stone. As a natural outcome of this, the Baháʼí Esperanto League was founded at the beginning of the 1970s, thus placing the activities of the Baháʼí Esperantists on a broader foundation.

== Founding the Baháʼí Esperanto League ==
There are signs that the idea of forming a collaboration of Baháʼí Esperantists was beginning to grow even at the beginning of the 1960s, particularly at the time immediately before the Esperanto World Congress in Budapest in 1966. Adelbert Mühlschlegel made efforts to bring this about but initially not very much was achieved. It was not until Paulo Amorim Cardoso accepted the faith in Brazil in 1971 that, with his help and that of Roan Orloff-Stone in the USA, the idea of a collaboration began, with surprising speed, to change into a viable project.

In a letter of July 1971 Cardoso, who at that time was secretary of the Local Spiritual Assembly of Fortaleza in Brazil, wrote, on behalf of that Assembly, that "it is our intention to create an international Baháʼí Esperanto organisation". With this letter he included a first draft of the constitution of the proposed organisation in which its main aims were defined, namely, the publication of Baháʼí literature in Esperanto, the dissemination of the Baháʼí Faith amongst the Esperantists and the promotion of Esperanto in the Baháʼí Community. He also enclosed with his letter a list (all together 18 names) of Baháʼí Esperantists in Brazil (8), India (1), Spain (1), Iran (1), Portugal (1) and the USA (6). It is very likely that Cardoso's letter was addressed to these 18 people. Also enclosed with his letter was another list, compiled by Roan Orloff-Stone, that contained the names and addresses in 13 different countries of 47 further persons, almost half of them being in the USA. In addition Cardoso began to produce and distribute a newsletter entitled "Komuna Bahaa Letero" ("Communal Baháʼí Newsletter"), which later grew into the official BEL Newsletter. It was then during the 57th Esperanto World Congress in Portland, Oregon (USA), that the nine participating Baháʼís consulted together and decided to write to the Universal House of Justice to seek its approval for the founding of a Baháʼí Esperanto organisation. After consulting with "Hand of the Cause of God" Adelbert Mühlschlegel, who according to them was "enthusiastic" about this proposal, the Universal House of Justice gave their consent in a letter dated 19 March 1973 (18.19.129 BE), a date which effectively marks the birth of the Baháʼí Esperanto League. In issue No. 5 (April 1973) of "Komuna Bahaa Letero" the House of Justice's consent was announced to all the Baháʼí Esperantists who were known to the initiators of the project. Simultaneously, application forms for membership in the League were sent out, together with voting slips for the election of the League's first managing committee.

This election was conducted according to the same principles that are applied when a Local Spiritual Assembly is elected (each member voted for nine persons from the body of all members, without the nomination of any candidates). In a message from the League, dated 30 July 1973, the result of the election, in which a total of 30 members had taken part, was announced: Paulo Amorim Cardoso (Brazil), Roan Orloff-Stone (USA), Habib Taherzadeh (Israel/Baháʼí World Centre), Adelbert Mühlschlegel (Switzerland), Badiollah Samimy (Iran), Manuel de Freitas (Portugal), S.C. Gupta (India), Chagzin Kim (Korea), Leonora Stirling Armstrong (Brazil). The term of office of the governing committee was fixed at three years. In issue No. 9 (November 1973) of the "Komuna Bahaa Letero" it was announced that "BEL now has 73 members in 14 countries: USA 27, Brazil 24, Canada 4, Iran 4, Spain 3, Italy 2, Portugal 2, Argentina 1, Austria 1, Germany 1, Israel 1, Korea 1, The Netherlands 1, Switzerland 1". And in the following issue, No. 10 (January 1974), it was announced: "Here are the names of the first managing committee of our dearly beloved Baháʼí Esperanto League: Chairman: Adelbert Mühlschlegel (Germany), Vice-chairman: Habib Taherzadeh (Israel), Secretary: Paulo Amorim Cardoso (Brazil), Vice-secretary: Roan Orloff-Stone (USA), Treasurer: Manuel de Freitas (Portugal), Vice-treasurer: Leonora Stirling-Armstrong (Brazil)". It was also announced that, in accordance with an earlier decision, all those who had become members up to the time of the election of the first managing committee would automatically be regarded as the founding members of BEL; there were 80 such members in 17 different countries.

== First activities ==
Apart from the task of gaining new members, one of the first activities of the League was the publication of basic Baháʼí information in Esperanto. The League also turned its attention to the question of Baháʼí terminology in Esperanto, for example the names of the 19 months of the Baháʼí Calendar (with issue No. 15 of the "Komuna Bahaa Letero", May 1975, a calendar was enclosed, in which the Baháʼí and Gregorian calendars were placed side by side). The League also applied to the World Esperanto Association (Universala Esperanto-Asocio, UEA) for official recognition of BEL as a "kunlaboranta faka asocio" (a cooperating specialised subgroup) of UEA. BEL's application for this status was accepted at the World Esperanto Congress in the following year.

In spite of the successes they had, for the new League the first few years were not easy. Not only were the individual members widely scattered throughout the world, but the members of the managing committee as well. This geographical separation inhibited joint action so that most of the activities were carried out by individuals and were often initiated by the BEL secretary himself. The first secretary was Paulo Amorim Cardoso (Brazil). His work was augmented by Roan Orloff-Stone (USA), who made a significant contribution towards the development of the League and attended all the Esperanto World Congresses between 1976 and 1988. With such a driving force as this, supported by the efforts of a few other dedicated members, the Baháʼí Faith was well represented at each of these Congresses.

In 1976, John T. Dale took over the secretaryship of BEL. Like his predecessor, P.A. Cardoso, he did great deal in moulding the character of the League. He contributed numerous ideas towards the development of BEL and initiated a series of projects, many of which were concerned with the publication of new material. He also took on the task of editing the BEL Newsletter, to which he gave the new name "BELmonda Letero". The name may be translated as "BEL World Letter", but the Esperanto pun on the first word ("belmonda" means "beautiful world") is lost in translation.

== Attempts, obstacles and achievements ==
Even after the initial founding years, the League went on being handicapped by the problem of geographical separation; the managing committee itself was unable to make personal acquaintance with the majority of the BEL members. On top of all this, in 1979, contact with the Baháʼí Esperantists in Iran (there had been 16 on the election list of 1976) had to be broken off because, in the wake of the Islamic Revolution, correspondence with the West would have been dangerous for these members.

One of the main tasks to which John Dale, in his capacity as secretary, dedicated himself "was to rectify the widespread misunderstanding on the part of Baháʼís of the Esperanto language". He found that the many of them favoured English as the future world language; others regarded Esperanto as the ideal candidate for this role but were not willing to learn it before a specific request to do so had come from the Universal House of Justice. "To overcome such misunderstanding of and resistance towards the activities of BEL, I took upon myself the following tasks: (1) to compile quotations from the Baháʼí Writings about Esperanto and the language problem; ... (2) to collect Baháʼí-Esperanto documents and to translate various Baháʼí texts into Esperanto; ... (3) to produce and distribute information material and basic documents in English and Esperanto as an aid towards making BEL better known among both Baháʼís and Esperantists."

The translation of John Esslemont's "Baháʼu'lláh and the New Era" — the most widely known introduction to the Baháʼí Faith — into Esperanto had been initiated by Martha Root and carried to completion by Lidia Zamenhof. The reissuing in 1978 of this translation, "Baháʼu'lláh kaj la Nova Epoko", after revision, additions and the inclusion of an appendix was certainly one of the greatest successes of this period.

Furthermore in 1976, under the editorship of John Dale, BEL published the brochure "Unueco kaj universala lingvo" (Unity and Universal Language) in four languages (Portuguese, Spanish, Esperanto and the original English). This was followed in 1977 by the brochure "Bahaaj Respondoj" (Baháʼí Answers) and in 1981 by "La Kaŝitaj Vortoj" (The Hidden Words), one of the central Writings of Baháʼu'lláh. In 1979 Dale also sent a letter, enclosing a copy of the "BELmonda Letero", to all National Spiritual Assemblies in order to make the existence of BEL better known to seek the cooperation of the national Baháʼí communities. Dale also wrote to the Universal House of Justice, requesting it "to consider ways and means of experimentally introducing Esperanto and encouraging the Baháʼís to learn the language."

A similar request had been made earlier by Cardoso. But again the attempt was in vain. The Universal House of Justice did not change its standpoint: although very much sympathising with the aims of the Baháʼí-Esperanto movement, it was opposed to the unofficial introduction of Esperanto (even if only temporary) into the Baháʼí Community, stressing that it was the principle of an international auxiliary language rather any one concrete proposal that Baháʼís supported. At that time Cardoso had been so disappointed that all his efforts were bearing no fruit that he left the Faith a few years later.

== New developments following the World Congresses in Beijing and Warsaw ==
During the second half of the 1980s, the centre of activity began to shift away from the Americas to Western Europe, Germany in particular, and it was during this time the League began to prosper. One reason behind this was that amongst the Baháʼís Esperanto had acquired the reputation of being an "entrance ticket" to countries behind the so-called Iron Curtain, countries to which the Baháʼí Faith had had no access during the preceding decades. In this connection, the Esperanto World Congress in Beijing in 1986, in which about a dozen BEL members from nearly as many different countries took part, and in the following the Centenary Congress in Warsaw in 1987, which was attended by an unprecedented number of Baháʼís (about 50 from 20 different countries).

In addition to the nucleus of the League, Baháʼí-Esperanto committees or subsidiary groups in Germany, the USA, Great Britain and Switzerland (in 1993 Bulgaria joined them) were set up in the past and in part are still functioning today. Following the "Internacia Junulara Kongreso" (IJK, International Youth Congress) in Kraków, Poland, in 1987, the League was even able to found a youth section, known as JuBEL, which for several years afterwards was able to arrange that young Baháʼí Esperantists took part in the annual International Youth Congresses (IJK) and that Baháʼí items were included in the congress programmes.

At the end of the 1980s and the beginning of the 1990s BEL was also able to organise a series of several-day seminars on the Faith, the so-called "BELaj Tagoj" (BEL Days or "Beautiful Days"), three of which took place in Poland and one each in Bulgaria and the Slovak Republic. And in 1992, Roman Dobrzynski, a Polish journalist and the then Vice-President of the UEA (Universala Esperanto-Asocio: Universal Esperanto Association), presented, during the Esperanto World Congress in Vienna, the Esperanto version of his film on the Faith and the Baháʼí World Centre in Haifa, Israel, entitled Ŝafejo de la Naŭa Profeto (Sheepfold of the Ninth Prophet).

Progress was also made in the publication of Baháʼí Esperanto literature; for example the two attractive brochures with colour printing: "La Vojo al Paco" (The Way to Peace) and "La Bahaa Kredo" (The Baháʼí Religion), as well as the very important publication entitled "La Promeso de Monda Paco" (The Promise of World Peace). In 1989 BEL made a significant contribution towards the publication of the well-known compilation by O.P. Ghai entitled Unueco en Diverseco (Unity in Diversity). And in 1992 BEL was also able to publish a small selection from the Writings of Baháʼu'lláh entitled Perloj de l'Saĝo (Pearls of Wisdom).

Not long after John T. Dale had tried to develop and more widely distribute the "BELmonda Letero", it shrank to a modest circular letter of 2 to 6 pages. It continues to function as the newsletter for all BEL members and is automatically distributed to them subscription-free. It contains membership information, important addresses, statements from the managing committee, news of activities in different countries and extracts from the Baháʼí Writings. It has become an important instrument of communication within the worldwide BEL community.

== BEL today ==
The membership of BEL increased over the years to more than 400, but an evaluation of the membership figures at the beginning of the 1990s showed that it had dropped to about half this number. As of 2005, BEL had 410 members in 64 countries. Most of the BEL members at that time were to be found in Bulgaria (59), Germany (56), the USA (45), Russia (35) and Great Britain (21). Right from the beginning, no membership charges were collected and, except for some donations from single National Spiritual Assemblies and other Baháʼí sources, the activities of the League were financed by voluntary contributions from its members.

In the last few years, BEL has concentrated on active participation in the Esperanto World Congresses, on the occasional publication of Baháʼí articles in Esperanto magazines, and on the translation of important Baháʼí documents: some in their entirety such as "La Promeso de Monda Paco" (The Promise of World Peace) in 1996, "Baháʼu'lláh" in 1992; others in the form of summaries such as in 1996 "La prospero de la homaro" (The Prosperity of Mankind) and "Turnopunkto por Ĉiuj Nacioj" (Turning Point for All Nations).

From time to time, BEL also tries to inform the Baháʼí world community about the Esperanto language and the Esperanto movement.

To celebrate the twenty-fifth anniversary of the founding of the League, a brochure of about 60 pages was published, with the title "Bahaismo kaj Esperanto. Festlibro okaze de la dudekkvinjariĝo de la Bahaa Esperanto-Ligo" (Bahaism and Esperanto. Commemorative Volume for the Twenty-fifth Anniversary of the Baháʼí Esperanto League). In this brochure, BEL looks back on a long history of the relationship and the cooperation between Baháʼís and Esperantists. The congratulatory openings by the Presidents of the Universal Esperanto Association (UEA) and of BEL itself are followed by Bernhard Westerhoff's essay on the changing, and not always completely harmonious, relationship between the Baháʼís and the Esperantists. This is followed by two essays by and about Lidia Zamenhof, which show how the youngest daughter of Zamenhof found her spiritual home in the Baháʼí Religion. Several central Baháʼí texts on both the question of the international language generally and Esperanto in particular — including a recent recommendation from the Baháʼís that the UNO should adopt an international language — are used to illustrate the Baháʼí point of view on this subject. A lengthy essay casts light on the historical growth of the relationship between Baháʼís and Esperantists, presents biographical sketches of prominent Baháʼí Esperantists and describes the development of BEL. Finally an introduction to the Baháʼí Faith and an overview of Baháʼí literature in Esperanto rounds off this 60-page booklet.

One BEL project, initiated by John Dale, is the publication of a compilation of texts from the Baháʼí Writings, concerning the principle an international auxiliary language. This project was later taken over by Bernhard Westerhoff and then passed on to Gregory Paul Meyjes, who in 2015 first published an annotated collection of Baha'i excerpts on the auxiliary language in English, which was followed by a translation in Esperanto in 2019.

== Sources ==
- This article comes from the non-copyright website of the Baháʼí Esperanto League.
  - La BELmonda Letero (n-ro 84, 1/2005)
