= Tabernacle of Unity =

Selected texts of Baháʼu'lláh, founder of the Baháʼí Faith

The Tabernacle of Unity is a small book, first published in July 2006, containing Baháʼu'lláh's Tablet, from the early ʻAkká period, to Mánikc͟hí Ṣáḥib, a prominent Zoroastrian, and a companion Tablet addressed to Mírzá Abu'l-Faḍl, the secretary to Mánikc͟hí Ṣáḥib at that time.

These, together with three shorter inspirational Tablets, offer a glimpse of Baháʼu'lláh's relationship with the followers of Zoroastrianism.

The title of this work is taken from the following passage:

The tabernacle of unity hath been raised; regard ye not one another as strangers.Ye are the fruits of one tree, and the leaves of one branch. Verily I say, whatsoever leadeth to the decline of ignorance and the increase of knowledge hath been, and will ever remain, approved in the sight of the Lord of creation. Say: O people! Walk ye neath the shadow of justice and truthfulness and seek ye shelter within the tabernacle of unity.

== Tablet to Mánikc͟hí Ṣáḥib (Lawh-i-Mánikc͟hí Ṣáḥib) ==
This Tablet, revealed at the request of Mánikc͟hí Ṣáḥib in pure Persian, consists of 19 paragraphs. It emphasizes the universality of Baháʼu'lláh's prophetic claim, and includes some of the central teachings of the Baháʼí Faith.

== Responses to questions of Mánikc͟hí Ṣáḥib from a Tablet to Mírzá Abu'l-Faḍl ==
This is a lengthy Tablet revealed on 1 July 1882. Among the subjects discussed are:

- The nature of creation.
- The connection between faith and reason.
- The reconciliation of the differences that exist among the laws and ordinances of various religions (Hinduism, the Mahabad Faith, Zoroastrianism, Christianity and Islam).
- Their respective claims to exclusivity.
- Their differing degrees of eagerness to welcome others into their fold.

== Tablet of the Seven Questions (Lawh-i-Haft Pursis͟h) ==
This Tablet is Baháʼu'lláh's reply to questions asked by Ustád Javán-Mard, an early Baháʼí of Zoroastrian background and ex-student of Mánikc͟hí Ṣáḥib.

The questions are relating to the following subjects:

- In what tongue and towards what direction should God be worshipped?
- The Faith of God
- Opposition
- S͟háh Bahrám
- The Bridge of Sirát, Paradise and Hell
- The soul
- The lineage and ancestry of Baháʼu'lláh

== Two other tablets ==
These two short Tablets, each addressed to a believer of Zoroastrian background, are inspirational in nature, calling the believers for deeds, not words.

== See also ==
- Baháʼí Faith and Hinduism
- Baháʼí Faith and Zoroastrianism
