= Baháʼí Faith and Hinduism =

Hinduism is recognized in the Baháʼí Faith as one of nine known religions. Krishna is included in the succession of Manifestations of God.

== References in the Baháʼí writings ==
Baháʼu'lláh was familiar with Hinduism, which is clear from a tablet to Mírzá Abu'l-Faḍl, the English translation of which is included in the volume Tabernacle of Unity. In this tablet Baháʼu'lláh answered questions about Hinduism and Zoroastrianism by Maneckji Limji Hataria. The subjects include comparative religion, and constitute, while much remains implicit, a dialogue of Baháʼu'lláh with Hinduism and the other religions discussed, giving an understanding of what Baha'u'llah meant with the unity of the world religions.

In another tablet (published in Gleanings, section LXXXVII) Baháʼu'lláh discussed the absence of records about history before Adam. Here he refers to the Jug-Basisht which is the Persian translation of the Yoga Vasistha, a syncretic philosophic text. The translation was done during the Mughal dynasty in the sixteenth century A.D. and became popular in Persia among intellectuals with Indo-Persian interests since then. In the Story of Bhusunda, a chapter of the Yoga Vasistha, an ancient sage, Bhusunda, recalls a succession of epochs in the earth's history, as described in Hindu cosmology. Juan Cole states that this means that in dating Creation, Baháʼu'lláh promotes the theory of a long chronology over a short one.

In a letter written on behalf of Shoghi Effendi, published in the Dawn of a New Day, p. 198, it is stated that:

"As regards your study of the Hindu religion. The origins of this and many other religions that abound in India are not quite known to us, and even the Orientalists and the students of religions are not in complete accord about the results of their investigations in that field. The Bahá'í writings also do not refer specifically to any of these forms of religion current in India. So, the Guardian feels it impossible to give you any definite and detailed information on that subject. He would urge you, however, to carry on your studies in that field, although its immensity is well-nigh bewildering, with the view of bringing the Message to the Hindus...."

== Teachings ==
=== God ===
In Hinduism, Brahman is believed to be the Absolute Reality. Followers of Vedanta see Brahman as an impersonal reality, of which each soul (ātman) is a part. The theistic traditions of Hinduism, which include Vaishnavism and Shaivism, consider Brahman as a personal God, whom they call Bhagwan or Ishvara (Lord). According to the Baháʼí teachings, these differing views are all valid and represent different points of view looking at the Absolute Reality.

=== Avatars and Manifestations of God ===
Both Hinduism and the Baháʼí Faith teach that God manifests himself at different times and places. These messengers are termed Avatars in Hinduism and Manifestations of God in the Baháʼí teachings. However the difference is that Hinduism teaches that Avatars are God himself in human form and are thus divine while Baháʼí teachings stress that the Manifestations of God are not God but his representatives.

=== Deities and images ===
In Hinduism many deities, depicted in images and murti (statues), are worshipped. Many Hindus believe that all these deities represent different aspects of the one God, Brahman. The Baháʼí teachings state that in this day, when mankind is reaching the state of maturity, images are not needed anymore to form an idea of God.

=== Ethical and moral teachings ===
There are many similarities in the ethical and moral teachings of Hinduism and the Baháʼí Faith. These include subject as contemplation, detachment, faith, love, non-violence, purity, respect for parents, righteousness, self-control, right speech, not stealing, truth, virtue, work as worship.

== Adaptation of Baháʼí teachings to Hindu context ==
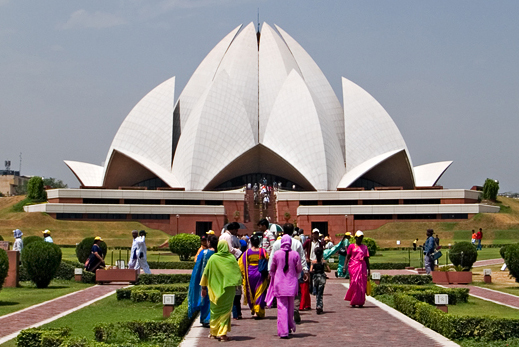
Baháʼí House of Worship, New Delhi, India.

The speedy growth of the Indian Baháʼí community since the 1960s was influenced by adapting the Baháʼí teachings for presentation in a clearly Hindu context familiar to the people of the countryside - using principles and language familiar to them:

- emphasizing the figures of Buddha and Krishna as past Manifestations of God or Avatars;
- references to Hindu scriptures such as the Bhagavad Gita;
- the substitution of Sanskrit-based terminology for Arabic and Persian where possible (i.e., Bhagavan Baha for Baháʼu'lláh), and the incorporation in both song (bhajan) and literature of Hindu holy places, hero-figures and poetic images;
- Hindi translations of Baha'i scriptures and prayers that appeared during this period which are so heavily Sanskritized as to make it difficult to recognize their non-Hindu antecedents.

== See also ==
- Baháʼí Faith and Buddhism
- Baháʼí Faith and Zoroastrianism
- Religion in India
- Baháʼí Faith in Nepal
- Baháʼí Faith and the unity of religion
- Hinduism and Islam
- Indo-Persian culture
