= Tablets of Baháʼu'lláh Revealed After the Kitáb-i-Aqdas =

Selected texts of Baháʼu'lláh, founder of the Baháʼí Faith

The Tablets of Baháʼu'lláh Revealed After the Kitáb-i-Aqdas are selected tablets written by Baháʼu'lláh, the founder of the Baháʼí Faith, and published together as of 1978. The current edition bears the title Fountain of Wisdom: A Collection of Writings from Baháʼu'lláh.

As his mission drew to a close after his writing of the Kitáb-i-Aqdas in 1873, Baháʼu'lláh continued to write unnumbered tablets and letters, doing so until the last days of his life in 1892.

Six of the tablets in this volume were translated into English and published in 1917. The translations were improved upon by Shoghi Effendi, and those not translated by him were filled in with the publication in 1978 under the supervision of the Universal House of Justice.

== Lawḥ-i-Karmil (Tablet of Carmel) ==
See online text here

The Tablet of Carmel (Persian: ﻟﻮﺡ ﻛﺮﻣﻞ) is a short tablet of only a few pages, but it is considered one of the charters of the Baháʼí administration. It consists essentially of a conversation between God and Mount Carmel. In it, God says to the mountain:

"Render thanks unto thy Lord, O Carmel. The fire of thy separation from Me was fast consuming thee... Rejoice, for God hath in this Day established upon thee His throne, hath made thee the dawning-place of His signs and the dayspring of the evidences of His Revelation... Beware lest thou hesitate or halt. Hasten forth and circumambulate the City of God that hath descended from heaven, the celestial Kaaba round which have circled in adoration the favoured of God, the pure in heart, and the company of the most exalted angels... Ere long will God sail His Ark upon thee, and will manifest the people of Bahá who have been mentioned in the Book of Names."

Shoghi Effendi described the tablet as "the Charter of the World Spiritual and Administrative Centers of the Faith on that mountain." Implying that this document established that Mount Carmel would be the physical location of the Baháʼí World Centre. The two other documents described as charters by Shoghi Effendi include the Tablets of the Divine Plan, and the Will and Testament of ʻAbdu'l-Bahá.

== Lawḥ-i-Aqdas (The Most Holy Tablet) ==
See online text here

The Lawḥ-i-Aqdas (Persian: ﻟﻮﺡ ﺍﻗﺪﺱ) or Most Holy Tablet, sometimes also referred to as the Tablet to the Christians, was addressed to a believer of Christian background. In the Tablet Baháʼu'lláh proclaims his message to Christians across the world, and in clear terms declares that his station is that of the Kingdom of the Father that Jesus Christ had promised.

== Bis͟hárát (Glad-Tidings) ==
See online text here

The Bis͟hárát (Arabic: ﺍﻟﺒﺸﺎﺭﺍﺕ) is a Tablet that is composed of fifteen headings, each designated a glad-tiding, where Baháʼu'lláh provides teachings and laws. While the identity of the person that Tablet was addressed to is not known, Adib Taherzadeh states that the tone of the utterances throughout the Tablet indicate that it was addressed to humankind and not specifically to an individual. Christopher Buck and Youli A. Ioannesyan call this tablet a "proclamatory Kitab-i-Aqdas", where a selection of laws from the Aqdas and supplementary texts, relevant for all humanity, are re-revealed. The main themes are abolishments of certain laws from other religions, and secular world reforms. In 1891 the Tablet was sent to Cambridge orientalist E.G. Browne and the St. Petersburg diplomat Victor Romanovich Rosen, who published translations of it in English and Russian respectively.

The fifteen glad-tidings are:

1. The abolition of the law of holy war practised by Muslims, where Baháʼu'lláh states that war of any kind is incompatible with the Baháʼí principles of love and unity.
2. The statement that everyone should associate with all the people of the world with a spirit of friendliness regardless of race or religion.
  "The second Glad-Tidings It is permitted that the peoples and kindreds of the world associate with one another with joy and radiance. O people! Consort with the followers of all religions in a spirit of friendliness and fellowship."
  (Baháʼu'lláh, Tablets of Baháʼu'lláh, p. 28)
3. Advocates the adoption of a universal language (See Baháʼí Faith and auxiliary language).
4. Serve Monarchs that protect the oppressed.
5. Exhorts Baháʼís to honesty and truthfulness towards their government.
6. Concerns the establishment of the Lesser Peace.
7. Confirms that clothing and facial hair are left to the discretion of each individual.
8. Abolishes the practice of idleness in the name of religion, performed by people who would lead an ascetic life and go into seclusion. Baháʼu'lláh instead states that every person must work for the betterment of humanity.
9. Abrogates the practice of the confession of sins as practiced by some Christian churches, and provides a prayer to be used by individuals to ask forgiveness directly of God.
10. Abolishes the law of the destruction of Books. This refers to the Báb's advice in the Bayán to destroy holy books of the past.
11. Permits the study of arts and sciences which "would redound to the progress and advancement of the people." This is in reference to some Muslim clergy who had forbidden the study of modern sciences.
12. Enjoins everyone to engage in some form of occupation, such as crafts, and trades and raises this occupation to the station of worship.
13. Writes about the duties of the Universal House of Justice and that they are charged with the affairs of all people.
14. States that it is not necessary to undertake long journeys to visit the resting-places of the dead. This is in reference to the practice by Muslims who believe that it is conducive to the forgiveness of sins. Baháʼu'lláh states that instead the cost of this journey should be offered to the Baháʼí Fund. While Baháʼu'lláh disapproves of special long journeys to visit the graves of the dead, he states that there is some spiritual value in praying at the resting-place of the dead.
15. Recommends a constitutional monarchy combined with representative democracy in preference to a republic.

== Ṭarázát (Ornaments) ==
See online text here

In the Ṭarázát (Arabic: ﺍﻟﻄﺮﺍﺯﺍﺕ) Baháʼu'lláh reveals some of his teachings and exhortations. The Tablet is composed of six headings, each designating an ornament representing the characteristics that each person should obtain. Baháʼu'lláh writes that truthfulness and sincerity are lacking in the world, and that corruption has spread. He also describes newspapers as the "mirror of the world" and delineates guidelines for the editorial staff.

The ornaments are:

1. That everyone should know oneself understand what characters leads to glory or poverty, and after he has understood this he should be active in a profession or craft that serves humankind. Baháʼu'lláh singles out people who dedicate themselves to the education of others.
2. That everyone should consort with the followers of all religions in a spirit of friendliness and fellowship.
3. That everyone should strive to obtain a good character, especially justice and fairness.
4. States that trustworthiness is the greatest character that leads to the security of the world.
5. That people should not defile their tongues with the abuse of others.
6. States that knowledge is a wondrous gift from God, and that everyone should try to acquire it.

Near the end of the Tablet, Baháʼu'lláh writes to the Bábís who didn't accept his claim as He whom God shall make manifest and who instead followed Mirza Yahya, and tells them not to follow the promptings of their own selves and passions; he admonishes them lovingly to return to the path of God.

== Tajallíyát (Effulgences) ==
See online text here and this online study outline.

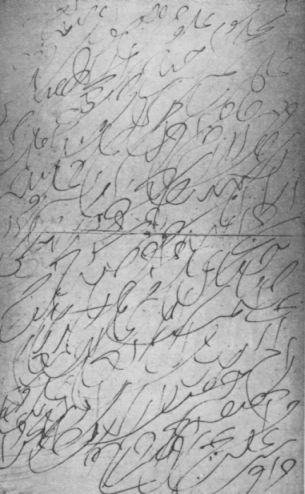
'Revelation writing': The first draft of a page from the Tajallíyát of Baháʼu'lláh

The Tajallíyát (Arabic: ﺍﻟﺘﺠﻠﻴﺎﺕ) was revealed circa 1885 while Baháʼu'lláh was in Bahjí in honour of Ustád ʻAlí-Akbar, who was one of the believers from the city of Yazd, and who designed the first Baháʼí House of Worship in Ishqábád. The first couple pages of the tablet are written in Arabic, and the remainder in Persian.

In the tablet, Baháʼu'lláh explains the station of the Manifestation of God, and specifically his own mission. He states that he has ushered in the Day of God, and that no one can recognize God except through him.

The tablet is written as four tajallís, or effulgences, which are:

1. The knowledge of God can only be obtained through the Manifestation of God.
2. Steadfastness in the cause of God is obtained by recognizing the Manifestation of God, and through faith in his wisdom and teachings.
3. It is incumbent upon everyone to acquire knowledge in the arts, crafts, and sciences, but only those that can help humanity advance, and "not those which begin with words and end with words."
4. Recognition of the divinity of the Manifestations of God.

== Kalimát-i-Firdawsíyyih (Words of Paradise) ==
See online text here

The Kalimát-i-Firdawsíyyih (Arabic: ﺍﻟﻜﻠﻤﺎﺕ ﺍﻟﻔﺮﺩﻭﺳﻴﺔ) was revealed by Baháʼu'lláh two years before his death in honour of his trusted disciple Ḥájí Mírzá Ḥaydar-ʻAlí. The tablet is partly written in a style where the words of God are written on ten leaves.

Among other things, Baháʼu'lláh states that people will be exalted through "honesty, virtue, wisdom and saintly character," and that the fear of God is a safe stronghold for all the peoples of the world. He states that living in seclusion or practising asceticism is not acceptable, and that instead all should work towards the betterment of humanity rather than that what profits themselves; he extols the praiseworthiness of charity and the use of sciences and arts to promote the well-being of humankind. He furthermore writes that moderation is desirable in all matters, and that anything taken to an excess is a source of evil. He also writes regarding the importance of the moral education of children. Furthermore, Baháʼu'lláh restates the Golden Rule:

"O son of man! If thine eyes be turned towards mercy, forsake the things that profit thee and cleave unto that which will profit mankind. And if thine eyes be turned towards justice, choose thou for thy neighbour that which thou choosest for thyself."

(Baháʼu'lláh, Tablets of Baháʼu'lláh, p. 64)

He further enjoins the kings and rulers of the world to uphold the cause of religion, and enjoins all the nations to cleave tenaciously to unity, which will lead to the well-being of humankind. He further writes about the use of an international auxiliary language to increase the unity of the world. He states that the basis of world order is established on the twin principles of reward and punishment, and that justice is the chief instrument for promoting unity and fellowship among people.

Regarding the Universal House of Justice, he authorizes its members "to take counsel together regarding those things which have not been outwardly revealed in the Book" referring to its legislative authority and infallibility in those matters. He commands the members of the Universal House of Justice "to ensure the protection and safeguarding of men, women and children."

== Lawḥ-i-Dunyá (Tablet of the World) ==
See online text here

The Lawḥ-i-Dunyá (Persian: ﻟﻮﺡ ﺍﻟﺪﻧﻴﺎ) was revealed in Haifa by Baháʼu'lláh in 1891 in honour of Áqá Mírzá Aqay-i-Afnán, whose mother was the sister of the wife of the Báb. The tablet was handed to Áqá Mírzá Aqay-i-Afnán's son by Baháʼu'lláh. In the opening of the tablet, Baháʼu'lláh bestows his bounties upon Hands of the Cause ʻAlí-Akbar and Trustee of Huqúqu'lláh, Amín who were imprisoned in Qazvin. Baháʼu'lláh then reiterates many of the teachings he had revealed in previous tablets, such as being detached from worldly desires, living a virtuous life, forbidding contention and conflict, and observing courtesy among other things.

Baháʼu'lláh then promulgates some of his teachings which were aimed for the unity of a world society, such as the establishment of an international language, the promotion of fellowship among all peoples, the education of children, the importance of agriculture, and the establishment of a constitutional government.

== Is͟hráqát (Splendours) ==
See online text here

The ʼIs͟hráqát (Arabic: ﺍﻻﺷﺮﺍﻗﺎﺕ) was written by Baháʼu'lláh circa 1885 while he was in Bahjí to Jalíl-i-K͟hu'í, a coppersmith and a believer from Azerbaijan in response to questions that Jalíl-i-K͟hu'í asked of him. The tablet starts in Arabic and continues in Persian. The title Ishráqát, which translates in English to "effulgences," "radiant lights," or "splendours," refers to the splendours of Baháʼu'lláh's Revelation.

Baháʼu'lláh, in the tablet, first calls the Bábís to accept Baháʼu'lláh's claim to be "He whom God shall make manifest," a figure who was foretold by the Báb. He then elucidates on the principle of the infallibility of the Manifestations of God, and discusses the response of humanity to new Manifestations of God when they appear and why humanity, in general, does not accept the new Manifestation of God. Baháʼu'lláh then discusses various prophecies of previous religions which he claims are fulfilled by his coming. He goes on to discuss the personal virtues and behaviours, mainly justice and trustworthiness, that all Manifestations of God have enjoined.

He then list the nine splendours of his revelation:

1. Those in power must have a profound regard for religion, for it is the means of all human prosperity and progress.
2. The Lesser Peace is necessary to humankind's tranquillity and advancement.
3. Everyone must obey God's commandments.
4. Humankind must exhibit upright character and perform deeds of service.
5. Governments must rule with justice and equity.
6. There must be an international auxiliary language that will bind all mankind together.
7. Education is of paramount importance.
8. The Universal House of Justice is given responsibilities for the well-being of humankind and are given legislative authority to make new and authoritative laws that are not specified in his writings.
9. The purpose of religion is to establish unity and concord among humankind. Humankind must follow the teachings God has sent.

Baháʼu'lláh explicitly makes the eighth Ishráq an addendum to the Kitáb-i-Aqdas. He also foresees Jalíl-i-K͟hu'í's defection from the covenant, which occurred after the passing of Baháʼu'lláh.

== Lawḥ-i-Ḥikmat (Tablet of Wisdom) ==
See online text here

The Tablet of Wisdom (Persian: ﻟﻮﺡ ﺍﻟﺤﻜﻤﺔ) was addressed to Áqá Muḥammad, a distinguished believer from the town of Qá'in, who was surnamed Nabíl-i-Akbar. In the abjad notation the name 'Muḥammad' has the same numerical value as 'Nabíl'. Baháʼu'lláh wrote the Tablet during his latter years in Akká and in the Tablet provides counsel regarding individual conduct, expounds the basic beliefs of some of the philosophers of ancient Greece, and writes about the fundamentals of true philosophy. The philosophers mentioned include the following:

- Empedocles
- Pythagoras
- Hippocrates
- Socrates
- Plato
- Aristotle
- Bálinus (Apollonius of Tyana)

== Aṣl-i-Kullu'l-K͟hayr (Words of Wisdom) ==
See online text here

The Words of Wisdom (Arabic: أﺻﻞ ﻛﻞ ﺍﻟﺨﻴﺮ) is a relatively short tablet of only three pages. Research has indicated that it was actually revealed before the Kitáb-i-Aqdas, but it is, at least for now, being kept in the publication. Through a series of short aphorisms, it describes the essence of wisdom, love, religion and detachment. One of the quotes from this Tablet, "The source of all learning is the knowledge of God, exalted be His glory" was chosen by Shoghi Effendi to adorn one of the doors on the House of Worship in Wilmette, Illinois.

== Lawḥ-i-Maqṣúd (Tablet of Maqṣúd) ==
See online text here

Out of respect, the Baháʼís, rather than addressing Baháʼu'lláh directly, would write to his amanuensis, Mírzá Áqá Ján. The reply would be in the form of a letter from Mírzá Áqá Ján quoting words of Baháʼu'lláh, but would, in fact, be dictated in its entirety by Baháʼu'lláh. Thus all parts of the tablet, even those which ostensibly are the words of Mírzá Áqá Ján himself, are sacred scripture by Baháʼu'lláh. The Tablet of Maqṣúd (Persian: ﻟﻮﺡ ﺍﻟﻤﻘﺼﻮﺩ) is in this form. It was addressed to Mírzá Maqṣúd, one of the early believers living at that time in Damascus and Jerusalem.

== Súriy-i-Vafá (Tablet of Vafá) ==
See online text here

The Súriy-i-Vafá (Arabic: ﺳﻮﺭﺓ ﺍﻟﻮﻓﺎ) was written to S͟hayk͟h Muḥammad Ḥusayn, one of the early believers of Shiraz, surnamed Vafá (Fidelity) by Baháʼu'lláh. The tablet was written while Baháʼu'lláh was in Akká, and was in response to some of the questions of S͟hayk͟h Muḥammad Ḥusayn. In the tablet, Baháʼu'lláh refers to the immensity and boundlessness of the spiritual worlds.

== Lawḥ-i-Siyyid-i-Mihdíy-i-Dahají (Tablet to Siyyid Mihdíy-i-Dahají) ==
See online text here

In the Tablet to Siyyid Mihdíy-i-Dahají (Persian: ﻟﻮﺡ ﺍﻟﺴﻴﺪ ﻣﻬﺪﻱ ﺩﻫﺠﻲ), Baháʼu'lláh writes to Siyyid Mihdíy-i-Dahají who later broke the Covenant. Baháʼu'lláh stresses the importance of serving the Baháʼí cause, and of teaching the Faith to others. He explains the power of a pure and stainless heart in influencing one's words to influence people, and asks that people memorize passages from the Holy Writings to use in the course of their speech. He also cautions against causing division and discord between people.

== Lawḥ-i-Burhán (Tablet of the Proof) ==
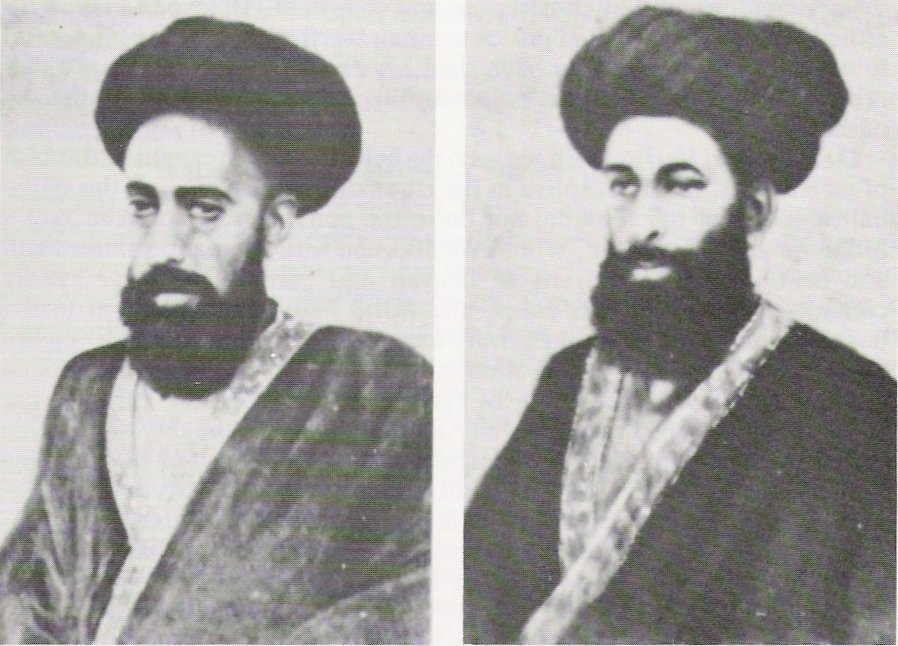
King of Martyrs (left), and Beloved of Martyrs (right)

See online text here

The Tablet of the Proof (Persian: ﻟﻮﺡ ﺍﻟﺒﺮﻫﺎﻥ) was written after the martyrdom of the King of Martyrs and the Beloved of Martyrs, and was addressed to S͟hayk͟h Muḥammad Báqir, denounced by Baháʼu'lláh as the 'Wolf'. In this tablet Baháʼu'lláh refers to Mír Muḥammad Ḥusayn, the Imám Jum'ih of Isfahán, surnamed the 'She-Serpent', who was S͟hayk͟h Muḥammad Báqir's accomplice in the persecution of the Baháʼís. The Epistle to the Son of the Wolf was addressed to the son of S͟hayk͟h Muḥammad Báqir.

== Kitáb-i-ʻAhd (Book of the Covenant) ==
The Kitáb-i-ʻAhd (Arabic: ﻛﺘﺎﺏ ﻋﻬﺪﻱ literally "Book of My Covenant") is Baháʼu'lláh's Will and Testament, where he selects ʻAbdu'l-Bahá as his successor. While the Tablet of the Branch, composed in the Adrianople period had clearly signaled a high station for "the Branch of Holiness" and the Kitáb-i-Aqdas has specified that this high station involved leadership of the Baháʼí community after Baháʼu'lláh's passing, it was only with the unsealing of the Kitáb-i-ʻAhd after the passing of Baháʼu'lláh that it was confirmed that the Branch referred to was indeed ʻAbdu'l-Bahá.

== Lawḥ-i-Arḍ-i-Bá (Tablet of the Land of Bá) ==
See online text here

Baháʼu'lláh wrote the Tablet of the Land of Bá (Persian: ﻟﻮﺡ ﺍﺭﺽ ﺍﻟﺒﺎء) on the occasion of ʻAbdu'l-Bahá's visit to Beirut, which is what is referred to as the Land of Bá. In the tablet, Baháʼu'lláh extolls the station of the Master and Most Mighty Branch, ʻAbdu'l-Bahá.

== Excerpts from Other Tablets ==
See online text here

In this portion of the compilation of the Tablets of Baháʼu'lláh, parts of further tablets from Baháʼu'lláh are included. Some of the topics discussed in this section include that God can be only known through the Manifestations of God, that humanity should be detached from self-glorification, and instead should follow the teachings of Baháʼu'lláh.
