= Baháʼí Faith and Zoroastrianism =

Zoroastrianism is recognized in the Baháʼí Faith as one of nine known religions and its scriptures are regarded as predicting the coming of Baháʼu'lláh. Zoroaster is included in the succession of Manifestations of God. The authenticity of the Avesta (Zoroastrian scriptures) is seen as uncertain.

== Ancestry of Baháʼu'lláh ==
Baháʼís believe that Baháʼu'lláh, born as Mírzá Ḥusayn-ʻAlí Núrí, is a descendant of Zoroaster and the last Zoroastrian king Yazdegerd III (d. 651). His father was Mírzá Buzurg, a nobleman from the Persian province of Mázindarán (formerly called Tabaristán). Mírzá Abu'l-Faḍl wrote a treatise regarding Baháʼu'lláh's ancestry.

== Prophecies ==
Zoroastrian prophecies foretell the coming of the world saver Saoshyant or 'Sháh Bahrám. Baháʼís regard these prophecies as having been fulfilled in the person of Baháʼu'lláh. The prophecy from the Jamasp Nama "It is said that the sun will stand in the midst of the sky in the time of Oshedar Bami [Hushedar] for 10 days and in the time of Oshedar Mah [Hushedar Mah] for 20 days and in the time of Soshyosh [Saoshyant] for 30 days" is interpreted as referring to Muhammad, the Báb and Baháʼu'lláh respectively.

== Baháʼí teachings on Zoroaster ==
In Baha'u'llah's writings, Zoroaster is referred to as "Him Who is the Spirit of purity". Baha'u'llah moreover goes on to write "...the fire-temples of the world stand as eloquent testimony to this truth. In their time they summoned, with burning zeal, all the inhabitants of the earth [to him]."

Zoroaster was an Iranian magus who lived in Central Asia around the first millennium BC. Baha'is believe that Zoroaster, inspired by God, rebelled against the pagan Aryan priesthood to preach a universal monotheism alongside an ethical dualism. Other key principles of Zoroaster's teachings included the search for truth, selfless love of others, respect for nature, and moral courage. Baha'is believe that the original Zoroastrian religion was essentially monotheist, with the "evil principle" of Angra Mainyu representing an impersonal, natural force. Baha'is believe the theological dualism present in the Zoroastrian faith during the Sasanian Era was a later development. As evidence of this, Baha'is point out that the earliest Gathas - thought to be composed by Zoroaster himself - do not make mention of an evil force independent of God, an attitude only found in the more recent writings of the Avesta.

== Scriptural sources ==
The volume Tabernacle of Unity is a collection of letters, containing Baháʼu'lláh's Tablet written in pure Persian to Mánikc͟hí Ṣáḥib, a prominent Zoroastrian, and a companion Tablet addressed to Mírzá Abu'l-Faḍl, the secretary to Mánikc͟hí Ṣáḥib at that time. These, together with three shorter inspirational Tablets, offer a glimpse of Baháʼu'lláh's relationship with the followers of Zoroastrianism.

In the tablet to Mírzá Abu'l-Faḍl Baháʼu'lláh answered questions about Zoroastrianism and Hinduism by Mánikc͟hí Ṣáḥib. The subjects include comparative religion, and constitute, while much remains implicit, a dialogue of Baháʼu'lláh with Zoroastrianism and the other religions discussed, giving an understanding of what Baha'u'llah meant with the unity of the world religions.

== Calendar ==
The Baháʼí calendar contains several elements of the Zoroastrian calendar. The months and the days of the month in the Zoroastrian calendar are dedicated to, and named after, a divinity or divine concept. In the Baháʼí calendar the names of the months, days and years are referring to divine attributes as well.

Naw-Rúz is the first day of spring and the beginning of the year in Iranian calendar, was originally a Zoroastrian festival, and the holiest of them all. It is believed to have been invented by Jamshid, the Great king. The Báb and later Baháʼu'lláh adopted the day as a holy day in the Baháʼí calendar and associated it with the Most Great Name of God.

== Early conversions ==
In the end of the 19th century the Zoroastrian community was largely concentrated in Yazd and Kirman in the south of Persia, and in India, where they are known as Parsis, the majority of Zoroastrians lived in Bombay. Since the 1880s a significant number of Zoroastrians from Yazd converted to the Baháʼí Faith. This was also the case in Bombay, where they contributed a lot in the growth of the Indian Baháʼí community. The first Zoroastrian Baháʼí is believed to be Kay-Khusraw-i-Khudádád from Yazd.

== See also ==
- Baháʼí Faith and Hinduism
- Baháʼí Faith and Buddhism
- Baháʼí Faith in India
- Baháʼí Faith in Iran
- Baháʼí Faith and the unity of religion
