= Baháʼí Faith and auxiliary language =

Bahá'í principle that an international auxiliary language should be adopted

The Baháʼí Faith teaches that the world should adopt an international auxiliary language, which people would use in addition to their mother tongue. The aim of this teaching is to improve communication and foster unity among peoples and nations. The Baháʼí teachings state, however, that the international auxiliary language should not suppress existing natural languages, and that the concept of unity in diversity must be applied to preserve cultural distinctions. The Baha'i principle of an International Auxiliary Language (IAL) represents a paradigm for establishing peaceful and reciprocal relations between the world's primary speech communities – while shielding them from undue linguistic pressures from the dominant speech community/communities.

Baha’u’llah

"Now praise be to God that Dr. Zamenhof has invented the Esperanto language. It has all the potential qualities of becoming the international means of communication. All of us must be grateful and thankful to him for this noble effort; for in this way he has served his fellowmen well. With untiring effort and self-sacrifice on the part of its devotees, Esperanto will become universal. Therefore, every one of us must study this language and spread it as far as possible." – ‘Abdu’l-Bahá, In: Dr. John Esslemont, Bahá’u’lláh and the New Era, p. 182 (2006 ed.). "Therefore I hope that you will make the utmost effort, so that this language of Esperanto may be widely spread." – Abdu’l-Bahá in Paris, France, in: Bahá’u’lláh and the New Era, p.183.

"Bahá’ís shall consider the study of this language [Esperanto] as an incumbent duty upon them and it will be to them a religious duty." – Abdu’l-Bahá, In: The Greatest Instrument,.

"All through America I have encouraged the Bahá'ís to study Esperanto; and to the extent of my ability I will strive in its spread and promotion." ‘Abdu’l-Bahá in "Star of the West", 1912

Mark Vernon in his renowned secular work "Chambers Dictionary of Beliefs and Religions" also observed the links between the Baha'i faith, Esperantism and Esperanto.

== Teaching and purpose ==
The teachings of the Baháʼí Faith have a strong focus on the unity of humankind. The Baháʼí teachings see improved communication between peoples throughout the world as a vital part of world unity and peace. The Baháʼí teachings see the current multiplicity of languages as a major impediment to unity, since the existence of so many languages cuts the free flow of information and makes it difficult for the average individual to obtain a universal perspective on world events.

The principle of the selection and institutionalization of a Universal/International Auxiliary Language is among the Baháʼí Faith's key tenets. Baháʼuʼlláh, the founder of the Baháʼí Faith, writing in the Tablets of Ishráqát and Maqṣúd, taught that the lack of a common language is a major barrier to world unity since the lack of communication between people of different languages undermines efforts toward world peace due to misunderstandings of language; he urged that humanity should choose an auxiliary language that would be taught in schools in addition to one's own native language, so that people could understand one another. He stated that until an auxiliary language is adopted, complete unity between the various parts of the world would continue to be unrealized. ʻAbdu'l-Bahá, the son of the founder of the religion, called the promotion of the principle of the international auxiliary language "the very first service to the world of man" and its realization as "the greatest achievement of the age in conferring profit and pleasure on mankind."

Baháʼuʼlláh stressed, however, that the auxiliary language should not suppress existing natural languages, and that the concept of unity in diversity must be applied to languages. The Baháʼí teachings state that cultural heterogeneity is compatible with unity, and that the Baháʼí teaching of unity requires the embracing of cultural diversity since, humanity is enriched by the various cultures throughout the world. The Baháʼí teachings state that having an international auxiliary language would remove the pressure from the natural aggrandizement of majority language groups and thus preserve minority languages, since each person would keep their own mother-tongue, and thus minority cultures.

== Choice of language ==
Neither Baháʼí literature, nor any of the various Baháʼí authorities, have specified which language should be used as global auxiliary. The Baháʼí writings state that any natural or constructed language may be selected. The predominant language of the time is not necessarily to be used as the auxiliary language by default. The Baháʼí writings stipulate that the auxiliary language is to be selected or invented by the world's parliaments and rulers, thus placing the choice of language in the hands of language planners. Baháʼuʼlláh states that a "world language will either be invented or chosen from among existing languages" and:

It is incumbent upon all nations to appoint some men of understanding and erudition to convene a gathering and through joint consultation choose one language from among the varied existing languages, or create a new one, to be taught to the children in all the schools of the world.

Various Baháʼí leaders have made various comments to certain languages and qualities. ʻAbdu'l-Bahá and Shoghi Effendi made occasional comments favorable to the notion that potential auxiliary languages be simple and easy to learn. ʻAbdu'l-Bahá also praised the ideal of Esperanto, a constructed language, and there was an affinity between Esperantists and Baháʼís during the late 19th century and early 20th century. While ʻAbdu'l-Bahá encouraged people to learn Esperanto, he never stated that it should become the auxiliary language.

On February 12, 1913, ʻAbdu'l-Bahá gave a talk to the Paris Esperanto Society,

Now, praise be to God that Dr. Zamenhof has invented the Esperanto language. It has all the potential qualities of becoming the international means of communication. All of us must be grateful and thankful to him for this noble effort; for in this way he has served his fellowmen well. With untiring effort and self-sacrifice on the part of its devotees Esperanto will become universal. Therefore, every one of us must study this language and spread it as far as possible so that day by day it may receive a broader recognition, be accepted by all nations and governments of the world, and become a part of the curriculum in all the public schools. I hope that Esperanto will be adopted as the language of all the future international conferences and congresses, so that all people need acquire only two languages—one their own tongue and the other the international language. Then perfect union will be established between all the people of the world. Consider how difficult it is today to communicate with various nations. If one studies fifty languages one may yet travel through a country and not know the language. Therefore, I hope that you will make the utmost effort, so that this language of Esperanto may be widely spread.

Also both Shoghi Effendi and the Universal House of Justice, the governing body of the Baháʼís, emphasized that there is no official Baháʼí endorsement of Esperanto as the international auxiliary language. Today there exists an active sub-community of Baháʼí Esperantists; the Baháʼí Esperanto-League was founded in 1973, and Lidia Zamenhof, daughter of Esperanto creator L. L. Zamenhof, was a Baháʼí. Ehsan Yarshater, the founding editor of Encyclopædia Iranica, notes how as a child in Iran he learned Esperanto and that when his mother was visiting Haifa on a Baháʼí pilgrimage he wrote her a letter in Persian as well as Esperanto. At the request of ʻAbdu'l-Baha, Agnes Baldwin Alexander became an early advocate of Esperanto and used it to spread the Baháʼí teachings at meetings and conferences in Japan. James Ferdinand Morton, Jr., an early member of the Baháʼí Faith in Greater Boston, was vice-president of the Esperanto League for North America.

The selection of the existing language or the creation of a new one each have their advantages; the selection of an existing language allows for a certain portion of the world's population to have already learnt it, but using an invented language would presumably have the advantage of being emotionally neutral.

== Mother tongue and unity in diversity ==
The Baháʼí teachings on an auxiliary international language does not in itself threaten living languages or cultures; they do not call for cultural uniformity. Instead, the Baháʼí teachings value and promote cultural diversity by stating that there should be unity in diversity. The term "auxiliary" in Baháʼí scripture means that the international language will be taught in addition to first languages and that it will be secondary to those. Since the auxiliary language is meant for community-external, inter-community communication, it is functionally separate from one's primary language. While secondary to the primary language of one's culture, it establishes reliable communication between members of differing primary speech communities.

The Baháʼí teachings see minority group members as full members of the broader society, and thus see the need for unique cultural rights. Language is strongly attached to culture. In Baháʼí literature, one's mother tongue is described as "the most profound characteristic of a people", "the garment of the spirit of the people", the "native air which we need for living and dying, which surrounds us from cradle to grave, which is and remains our most personal property." Whereas both cultural and linguistic change are normal and ever-greater world unity expected, the precipitous extinction of non-dominant languages and cultures is therefore undesirable. Since the Baháʼí teachings on oneness of humankind emphasize the value of both diversity and unity in the sense of harmony rather than simple sameness, minority cultural rights can be seen as a matter of cultural justice, and language rights a subset of those cultural rights.
