= Baháʼí Faith and Buddhism =

Teachings of the Baháʼí Faith regarding Buddhism

The teachings of the Baháʼí Faith regard Buddhism as a religion founded by a Manifestation of God, and Baháʼu'lláh as the expected Maitreya Buddha. The authenticity of the current canon of Buddhist scriptures is seen as uncertain. In recent years there has been an increase in the number of Baháʼís from Buddhist background.

== Baháʼí scholarship ==
The differences between religious concepts in Buddhism and the Abrahamic religions has caused questions for Baháʼí scholarship. Jamshed Fozdar presents the Buddhist teaching about an unknowable reality as referring to the concept of God, for example in the following passage from the Udana (v.81) in the Khuddaka Nikaya: "There is, O monks, an Unborn, Unoriginated, Uncreated, Unformed. Were there not, O monks, this Unborn, Unoriginated, Uncreated, Unformed, there would be no escape from the world of the born, originated, created, formed. Since, O monks, there is an Unborn, Unoriginated, Uncreated, Unformed, therefore there is an escape from the born, originated, created, formed."

Baháʼí scholar Moojan Momen argues that there are many similarities between the ethical teachings in Theravada Buddhism and the Baháʼí Faith, and that the apparent metaphysical differences originate from culture-bound terminologies. Momen further argues that the Baháʼí teachings uphold all parts of the Noble Eightfold Path: right view, right aim or right-mindedness, right speech, right action, right living or livelihood, right effort or endeavour, right mindfulness and right contemplation.

== See also ==
- Baháʼí Faith and Hinduism
- Baháʼí Faith and Zoroastrianism
- Baháʼí Faith and Native Americans
- Religion in India
- Baháʼí Faith in Nepal
- Baháʼí Faith and the unity of religion
