= Baháʼí teachings =

Theological, social, and spiritual principles in the Baháʼí Faith

The teachings of the Baháʼí Faith are derived from the writings of Baháʼu'lláh, its founder. A corpus of Baháʼí literature include books and writings of the Báb and Baháʼu'lláh, along with the public talks and writings of ‘Abdu’l-Bahá, the founder's son. A central tenet of the Baháʼí Faith is the unity of the world's major religions (Zoroastrianism, Hinduism, Judaism, Buddhism, Christianity, and Islam) as part of a single plan overseen by one God. The teachings also address theological subjects including the oneness of God, humanity and religion, as well as aspects of human life such as the harmony of science and religion, elimination of extreme wealth and poverty, universal compulsory education, and the equality of all people equality, regardless of gender, race, nationality, colour, or social class.

== Summary ==
In the course of ‘Abdu’l-Bahá’s journeys to the west during 1911 and 1912–1913, he clearly summarized the basic principles underlying Baháʼu’llah's teachings, which together with the laws and ordinances of the Kitáb-i-Aqdas constitute the foundation of the Baháʼí Faith:

The independent search after truth, unfettered by superstition or tradition; the oneness of the entire human race, the pivotal principle and fundamental doctrine of the Faith; the basic unity of all religions; the condemnation of all forms of prejudice, whether religious, racial, class or national; the harmony which must exist between religion and science; the equality of men and women, the two wings on which the bird of human kind is able to soar; the introduction of compulsory education; the adoption of a universal auxiliary language; the abolition of the extremes of wealth and poverty; the institution of a world tribunal for the adjudication of disputes between nations; the exaltation of work, performed in the spirit of service, to the rank of worship; the glorification of justice as the ruling principle in human society, and of religion as a bulwark for the protection of all peoples and nations; and the establishment of a permanent and universal peace as the supreme goal of all mankind—.

== Unity ==
Central to the teachings of the Baháʼí Faith are the three basic assertions, Oneness of God, Oneness of Religion and Oneness of Humanity, also referred to as the unity of god, unity of religion, and unity of mankind. The Baháʼí writings state that there is a single, all-powerful god who reveals his message through a series of divine messengers or educators whose teachings are regarded as contributing to the “carrying forward of an ever advancing civilisation", a process which is viewed as a succession of revelations from God and described as "progressive revelation". This one progressively revealed religion is offered to one single humanity, all of whom possess a rational soul and who only differ according to colour and culture. This idea is fundamental not only to explaining Baháʼí beliefs, but also to explaining the attitude Baháʼís have towards other religions, which they regard as divinely inspired. The acceptance of every race and culture in the world has brought Baháʼí demographics diversity, which has led to the Faith becoming the second most widespread faith in the world, its literature being translated into over 800 languages.

=== The oneness of God ===
The Baháʼí view of God is essentially monotheistic. God is the imperishable, uncreated being who is the source of all existence. He is described as "a personal God, unknowable, inaccessible, the source of all Revelation, eternal, omniscient, omnipresent and almighty". Though transcendent and inaccessible directly, his image is reflected in his creation. The purpose of creation is for the created to have the capacity to know and love its creator.

In Baha'i belief, although human cultures and religions differ on their conceptions of God and his nature, the different references to God nevertheless refer to one and the same Being. The differences, rather than being regarded as irreconcilable constructs of mutually exclusive cultures, are seen as purposefully reflective of the varying needs of the societies to which the divine messages were revealed.

The Baháʼí teachings state that God is too great for humans to be able to create an accurate conception of him. In Baháʼí understanding, the attributes attributed to God, such as All-Powerful and All-Loving, are derived from limited human experiences of power and love. Baháʼu'lláh taught that the knowledge of God is limited to those attributes and qualities which are perceptible to us, as a result of which knowledge of God is not possible. Furthermore, Baháʼu'lláh states that knowledge of the attributes of God is revealed to humanity through his messengers.

As our knowledge of things, even of created and limited things, is knowledge of their qualities and not of their essence, how is it possible to comprehend in its essence the Divine Reality, which is unlimited? ... Knowing God, therefore, means the comprehension and the knowledge of His attributes, and not of His Reality. This knowledge of the attributes is also proportioned to the capacity and power of man; it is not absolute.

The Baháʼí writings abound with names and attributes of God through which human beings are able to have a degree of understanding of him as one, personal, yet unknowable supreme reality; however, the teachings nevertheless reject anthropomorphic, pantheistic or incarnationist conceptions of God. The Baháʼí teachings state that one draws closer to God through prayer, meditation, study of the holy writings, and service.

=== The oneness of humanity ===
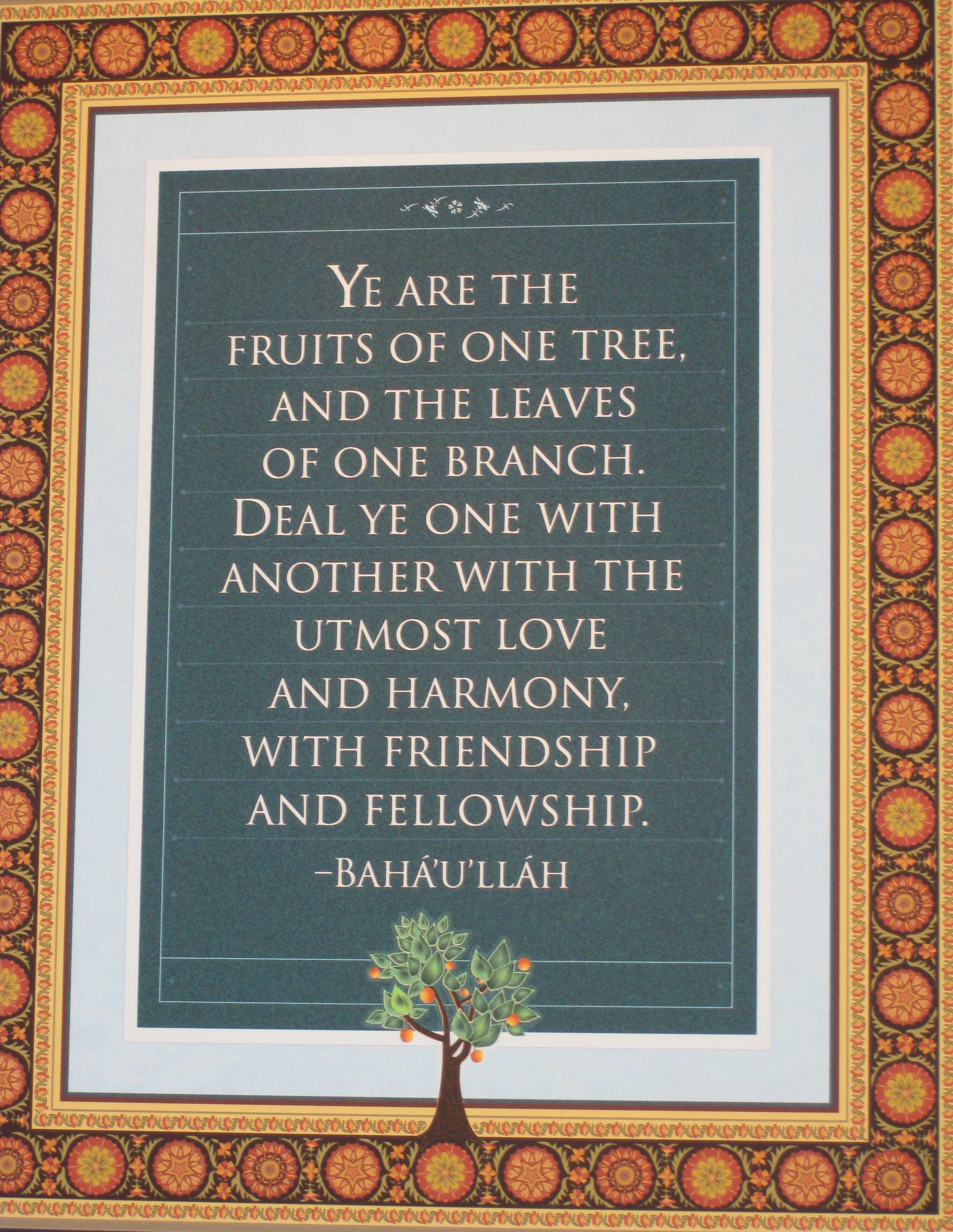
Quotation from the Baháʼí writings

The Baháʼí writings teach that humanity is one, with all people being equal in the sight of God. The Baháʼí Faith emphasizes that the unity of humanity transcends all divisions of race, nation, gender, caste, and social class, at the same time celebrating its diversity. ʻAbdu'l-Bahá states that the unification of mankind has now become "the paramount issue and question in the religious and political conditions of the world." The Baháʼí writings affirm the biological, political, and spiritual unity of mankind, Baháʼu'lláh stating:

Ye are the fruits of one tree, and the leaves of one branch. Deal ye one with another with the utmost love and harmony, with friendliness and fellowship.

The Baháʼí writings stress that the whole human race is one unified unit, one distinct species, Baháʼu'lláh stating, "We created you all from the same dust". The Baháʼí writings further stress that differences between various races, nations, and ethnic groups are either superficial (e.g. skin colour) or are the result of differences in background or education. One of the principal Baháʼí teachings is the elimination of all forms of prejudice, including racial, gender, economic and social. .

The Baháʼí teachings state that while ethnic and cultural diversity will continue to exist, humanity's first allegiance will be with the human race rather than any subsidiary group such as race, nation, or ethnic group. There will be an end not only to war, but also to inter-group rivalry.

While the Baháʼí writings stress the importance of world unity and that of its peoples, unity is not equated with uniformity, the writings affirming the value of cultural, national and individual diversity through the principle of "Unity in diversity," and stating that whilst recognizing the unity of mankind, cultural diversity should be celebrated. Unity in diversity is commonly explained in the Baháʼí writings through the analogy of flowers in a garden in which the different coloured flowers enhance the beauty of the garden.

It [the Faith] does not ignore, nor does it attempt to suppress, the diversity of ethnic origins, of climate, of history, of language and tradition, of thought and habit, that differentiate the peoples and nations of the world... Its watchword is unity in diversity...

=== The oneness of religion ===
The Baháʼí teachings state that there is one religion which God reveals progressively to mankind through his prophets/messengers as humanity matures and its capacity to understand grows. Baháʼí writings affirm that outward differences between the religions are due to the exigencies of the time and place in which each religion was revealed. Baháʼu'lláh claimed to be the most recent of God's messengers, but not the last, in a series of divine educators which include, amongst others, Jesus, Buddha and Muhammad.

The Baháʼí writings state that the essential nature of God's messengers is twofold, being at once human and divine. They are divine in that they all come from the same god and expound his teachings. However, whilst they can be viewed in the same light they are also separate individuals known by different names, each fulfilling a definite mission and entrusted with a specific revelation.^{[6]} In many of his writings Baháʼu'lláh states that denying any of the messengers of God is equivalent not only to denying all his messengers, but also God himself. Regarding the relationships between these educators, which Baháʼís refer to as Manifestations of God, Baháʼu'lláh writes:

God hath ordained the knowledge of these sanctified Beings to be identical with the knowledge of His own Self. Whoso recognizeth them hath recognized God. Whoso hearkeneth to their call, hath hearkened to the Voice of God, and whoso testifieth to the truth of their Revelation, hath testified to the truth of God Himself. Whoso turneth away from them, hath turned away from God, and whoso disbelieveth in them, hath disbelieved in God ... They are the Manifestations of God amidst men, the evidences of His Truth, and the signs of His glory.

== Progressive revelation ==
Baháʼís believe that God reveals his will to mankind progressively at different times and in different places through messengers/prophets referred to as Manifestations of God, each of whom successively establishes a covenant and a religion. According to the Baháʼí writings this process of revelation is eternal, contrary to many other belief systems which believe in the finality of their prophet/messenger. The general theme of the successive and continuous religions founded by Manifestations of God is that there is an evolutionary tendency, and that each Manifestation of God brings a greater measure of revelation (or religion) to humankind than the previous one. Differences between the revelations brought by the Manifestations of God are not inherent attributes of the Manifestations of God, but are instead attributed to the various worldly, societal and human factors, differences which are in accordance with the "conditions", "varying requirements of the age" and "spiritual capacity" of humanity. These differences are recognised as being required due to the fact that human society has gradually evolved through higher stages of unification from the family to tribes and then nations.

Each messenger proclaimed eternal moral and spiritual truths which were renewed by succeeding messengers, each of whose teachings reflected the distinct spiritual and material evolution of humanity at the time. According to the Baháʼí view, as humanity's spiritual capacity and receptivity has increased over time, the extent to which these spiritual truths are expounded changes.

Baháʼu'lláh explained that the appearance of successive messengers was like the annual coming of Spring, bringing new life to a world which has come to neglect the teachings of the previous messenger. He also used an analogy of the world as the human body, and revelation as a robe of "justice and wisdom".

Baháʼu'lláh mentioned in the Kitáb-i-Íqán that God will renew the "City of God" about every thousand years, and specifically mentioned that a new Manifestation of God would not appear within 1000 years of Baháʼu'lláh's message.

=== Covenant ===
A covenant is an agreement between groups of people involving mutually agreed obligations. The covenant in the Baháʼí Faith, which is referred to as 'the pivot of mankind and which assures the unity of the Faith', alludes to two specific covenants running through religious history. The first is the Greater Covenant which is made between each Manifestation of God and his followers in regard to the promised coming of the next Manifestation. As demonstrated in prophesy, every Manifestation, including Abraham, Moses, Jesus, Muhammad, the Báb and Baháʼu'lláh, prophesied the coming of the next, their followers obliged to investigate the claims of the following Manifestation. The Lesser Covenant concerns the Manifestation and his immediate successorship, by which Bahá’u’lláh appointed ʻAbdu'l-Bahá as the centre of his covenant in his Book of the Covenant. In his Will and Testament 'Abdu'l-Bahá directed the believers to follow Shoghi Effendi, who in turn promised a continuation of divine guidance through the future Universal House of Justice. The Baháʼí Covenant also refers to a more generic covenant by which, in return for his bounties, God demands recognition of his Messengers and obedience to his laws.

== Social principles ==
During his tours of Europe and North America 'Abdu'l-Bahá regularly summarised the central points pertinent to Baháʼí belief in lists of principles which include the following. The list is not authoritative and a variety of such lists exist.

=== Equality of women and men ===
The teachings of the Baháʼí Faith affirm the equality of women and men, Baháʼu'lláh stating that God has now removed distinctions which had previously separated the stations of men and women. Thus, women and men are equal in the sight of God. In his writings and talks ʻAbdu'l-Bahá repeatedly emphasised gender equality as being one of the most distinguishing teachings of the Baháʼí Faith, stating that both women and men possess the same potential for virtues and intelligence; he also compared the status of women and men and the progress of civilization with the two wings of a bird in that only if both wings are strong will the bird of humanity be able to fly. Women and men should be given the same opportunities in regard to education, including access to the same curriculum, at the same time being offered the same economic, social and political rights.

While the Baháʼí teachings assert the full spiritual and social equality of women and men, they nevertheless confirm gender differentiation in certain areas of life. Women and men are recognized as having different strengths and abilities which enable them to better fill different roles. Thus there are certain teachings that give preference to men in some limited circumstances and some that give preference to women, one aspect relating to the biological reality of potential motherhood for women. ʻAbdu'l-Bahá stated that where necessary, girls should be given educational priority since as potential mothers they would be the first educators of their children.

In terms of Baháʼí administration, all positions except for membership on the Universal House of Justice are open to women and men. Although no specific reason has been given for this exception, ʻAbdu'l-Bahá has stated that there is a wisdom in it which will eventually become clear.

=== Harmony of religion and science ===
The harmony of science and religion is a central tenet of the Baháʼí teachings, stressing that true science and true religion must be in harmony, and thus rejecting the view that science and religion are in conflict. ʻAbdu'l-Bahá asserted that religion based on superstition and which does not accord with science but is instead based on human concepts and ideas, should be rejected. When religion is in conformity with science its foundation is firm, and it has the ability to affect the human heart. ʻAbdu’l-Bahá also affirmed that reasoning powers are required in order to understand the truths of religion, and condemned civilizations based solely on materialistic beliefs which, despite technical excellence, give rise to such moral atrocities as war.

=== Universal education ===
The teachings of the Baháʼí Faith emphasise the importance of education, both religious and secular, as being a vital component in the progress of humanity, with a focus on promoting moral and spiritual education in addition to the arts, trades, sciences and professions. In his writings Baháʼu'lláh stated that the spiritual capacities of the individual could only be achieved through spiritual education, necessitating spiritual/religious education for children from an early age. In this respect the Baháʼí teachings stress that it is the obligation of parents to provide for the education of their children, with particular attention being given to the education of girls.

=== Universal auxiliary language ===
The Baháʼí teachings view improved communication between all people throughout the world as being of vital importance in bringing about world unity and peace. The multiplicity of languages currently in use are considered as being a major impediment to unity, stifling a free flow of information and making it difficult for the average unilingual individual to acquire a universal perspective on world events.

Baháʼu’lláh encouraged humanity to choose an auxiliary language to be taught in schools alongside the local native language in order that the people of the world would be able to understand one another wherever they go to on the planet. Baháʼu’lláh stressed that complete unity between the various parts of the world would continue to be an unreality until the adoption of an auxiliary language.

Baháʼu'lláh also stressed that the auxiliary language should in no way suppress existing natural languages, with the concept of unity in diversity being applied to languages as it is to other differences. The Baháʼí teachings state that cultural diversity is compatible with unity, and that since humanity is enriched by the innumerable cultures of the world now is the time to embrace cultural diversity in the quest for unity. The Baháʼí teachings also state that having an international auxiliary language would remove pressure from the natural aggrandizement of majority language groups and help to preserve minority languages, at the same time conserving minority cultures.

=== Elimination of extremes of wealth and poverty ===
The teachings of the Baháʼí Faith state that the elimination of extreme wealth and poverty is essential, ʻAbdu'l-Bahá drawing attention to the fact that they impede a compassionate society since extreme poverty demoralizes the poor, and extreme wealth overburdens the rich. Baháʼu’lláh ordained that the rich should protect the poor, who are a divine trust, and in order to address the extremes of wealth and poverty and provide for the welfare of all people, the Bahá’i teachings prescribe effective institutions, including Huqúqu'lláh, and the cultivation of a sense of social mutual concern.

Both Baháʼu’lláh and ʻAbdu’l-Bahá endorsed the economic reorganisation of society as a means by which extremes of poverty and wealth would be abolished, but while they stressed the importance of dignity and equal rights for all despite social status, they did not promote the philosophies of communitarianism or communism, Baháʼu’lláh legitimising the personal ownership of property and the right to transfer property deeds. ʻAbdu'l-Bahá further noted that whilst being detached from worldly things is a virtue, wealth in itself is not evil, in some circumstances enabling individuals to offer help to society through promoting social welfare and education.

== Independent investigation of truth ==
Baháʼu'lláh taught that every individual must investigate truth independently, without blindly following the beliefs of others or relying upon superstition and tradition as sources of knowledge. The Baháʼí writings state that in order to investigate truth the individual must abandon all prejudices, whilst stressing that since the essential Truth underlying reality is one, independent investigation is a powerful step towards the oneness of humanity.

Baháʼís are encouraged to meditate and reflect daily on the Baháʼí writings in what has been termed "an eternal or unending process" of seeking the truth. This journey can have a mystical element in which the seeker after truth is driven by their attraction to the beauty of God, as highlighted in Baháʼu'lláh's mystical writings, such as 'The Seven Valleys'.

The Baháʼí teachings explain that since human beings possess a "rational soul”, they are unique among all other forms of life ʻAbdu’l-Bahá stating that in order to foster this capacity for reason "God has given us rational minds for this purpose, to penetrate all things, to find truth". Alongside reason, the Baháʼí teachings also state that faith is an attribute of the human soul. While it is sometimes assumed that there is a distinction between heart and mind or faith and reason, for Baháʼís, faith is not an irrational blindness to fact. Shoghi Effendi asserts that Baháʼu'lláh "does not ask us to follow Him blindly" and encourages Baháʼís to "Read His [Baháʼu'lláh's] words, consider His teachings, and measure their value in the light of contemporary problems". For Baháʼís the word faith indicates a sense of "conscious knowledge" and a conviction that is expressed in "the practice of good deeds". Faith must also involve sincerely and wholeheartedly serving the public interest. Thus in the Baháʼi Faith, as one writer puts it, "reason is necessary but not sufficient". Both faith and reason are required in order to attain reality and truth.

== Spiritual teachings ==
The Bahá'í writings contain many references to spiritual qualities and values that individuals should strive to develop. The elements of good character include, among others, trustworthiness, truthfulness, faithfulness, sincerity, purity of motive, dignity, avoidance of backbiting, service, justice, moderation, cleanliness, all balanced by reason and knowledge.

God is described in the Baháʼí writings as being a single, personal, inaccessible, omniscient, omnipresent, imperishable, and almighty God who is the creator of all things in the universe. The existence of God and the universe is thought to be eternal, without beginning or end. The teachings of the Baháʼí Faith state that God is beyond the comprehension of human beings, and that human understanding of God is only possible through his Manifestations. Since God is beyond the comprehension of the human mind knowledge of him is possible only through his attributes and qualities, such as the all-powerful, the all-loving, the infinitely just, terms which are limited to the human experience. The social principles taught by God's Manifestations offer an environment in which spiritual growth is enabled, and the true purpose of society is made possible, the human purpose being to learn to know and love God through such methods as prayer, reflection and being of service to humankind.

The Baháʼí writings state that human beings have a "rational soul" which provides the species with a unique capacity to recognize God's station and humanity's relationship with its creator. Every human is seen as having a duty to recognize God through his messengers, and to conform to their teachings. Through recognition and obedience, service to humanity and regular prayer and spiritual practice, the Baháʼí writings state that the soul becomes closer to God, the spiritual ideal in Baháʼí belief. When a human dies, the soul passes into the next world, where its spiritual development in the physical world becomes a basis for judgment and advancement in the spiritual world. Baháʼís' believe in the eternal life of the soul rather than reincarnation. Heaven and Hell are taught to be spiritual states of nearness or distance from God that describe relationships in this world and the next, and not physical places of reward and punishment achieved after death.

== Organization ==
The fundamental element crucial to the development, growth and unity of the Baháʼí Faith is its Administrative Order. The Covenant of Baháʼu'lláh constitutes the foundational charter for his religion, the key documents being his Kitáb-i-Aqdas and Kitab-i-‘Ahd and the Will and Testament of ʻAbdu'l-Bahá‘ which is the charter for the development of the Administrative Order. The institutions of the Administrative Order fall into two distinct bodies, the elected and the appointed, both of which are guided by The Universal House of Justice, which is situated in Haifa, Israel.

=== Consultation as a process for resolving differences ===
Consultation is a fundamental element in the functioning of Baháʼí organization at all levels of administration, and a method of decision-making through which all the institutions of the Baháʼí Faith operate. Consultation enables a decision-making process in which all those engaged are encouraged to express their thoughts freely without criticism, and which aims to discover truth through universal participation and disciplined cooperation.

== See also ==
- Baháʼí laws
- Baháʼí literature
- Criticism of the Baháʼí Faith
- Outline of the Baháʼí Faith
- Ruhi Institute
- Socio-economic development (Baháʼí)
