= Sooy Place, New Jersey =

Populated place in Burlington County, New Jersey, US

- Unincorporated community
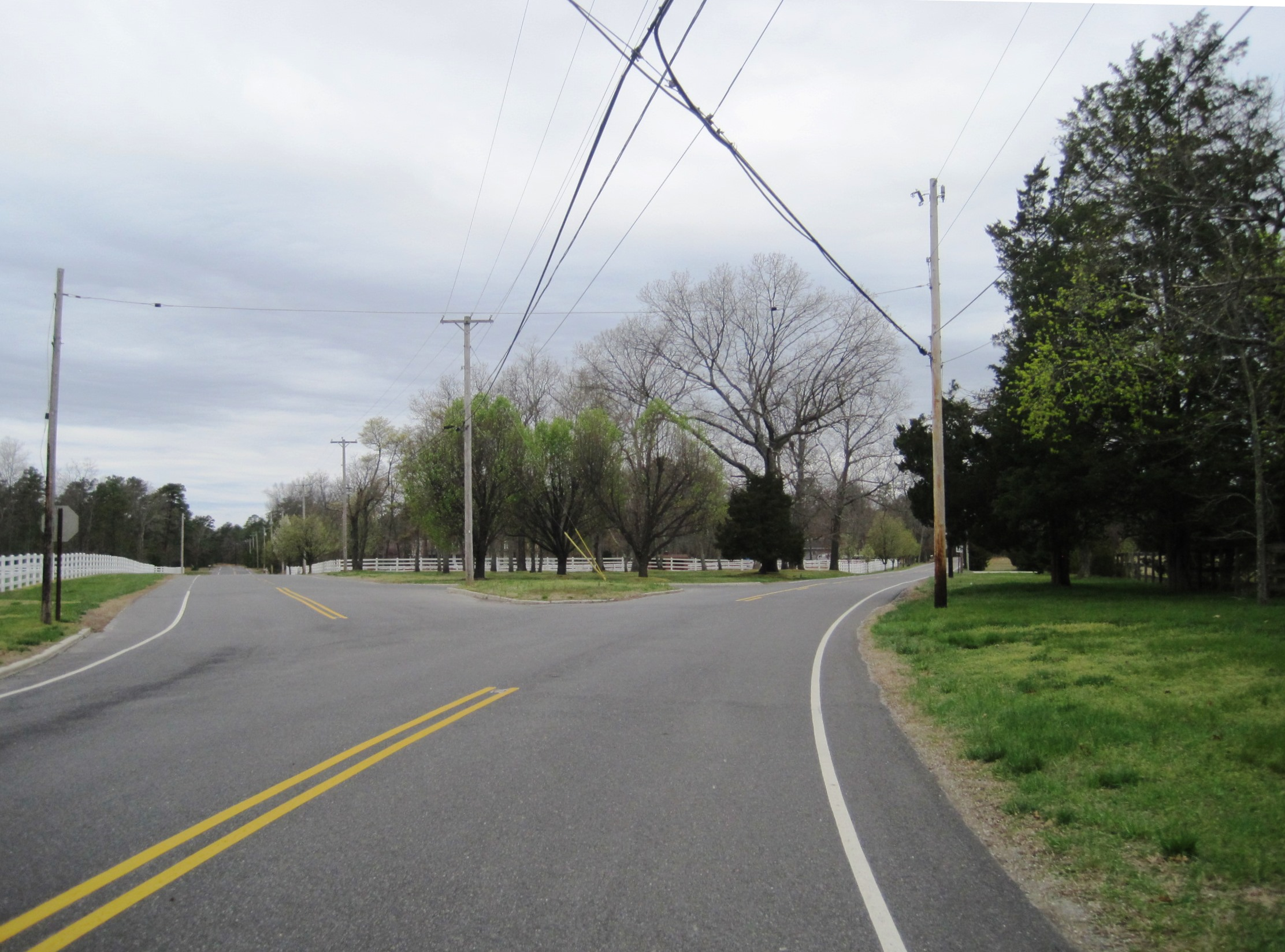
- Along Sooy Place Road at the intersection with Powell Place Road

- Location in Burlington County (Inset: Burlington County in New Jersey) Sooy Place (New Jersey) Sooy Place (the United States)
- Coordinates: 39°52′03″N 74°39′08″W
- Country: United States
- State: New Jersey
- County: Burlington
- Township: Tabernacle
- Elevation: 95 ft (29 m)
- GNIS feature ID: 880700

Sooy Place (pronounced so-ee) is an unincorporated community located within Tabernacle Township in Burlington County, in the U.S. state of New Jersey. The settlement is located in a rural part of the township centered on the intersection of Sooy Place Road and Powell Place Road. The area consists of a mix of forestland, single-family residences, and two horse farms.

According to a historical marker at the intersection, the settlement was also home to Pine Tavern, a stopover for travelers heading to Speedwell Furnace, which was located near Chatsworth.
