= Tabernacle, Virginia =

Unincorporated community in Virginia, US

Coordinates: 37°25′23″N 76°17′47″W

Tabernacle is an unincorporated community in Mathews County, in the U. S. state of Virginia.
