= Local church =

Local church may refer to:

- Church (congregation), a congregation meeting in a particular location
- Local churches (affiliation), a Christian group founded by Watchman Nee
- Parish church, a local church united with other parishes under a bishop or presbyter
- Congregationalist polity, a form of church organization by which each local church that governs itself independently
- Particular church, Roman Catholic ecclesial community
- "Local church" is the expression used to designate an autocephalous church in Eastern Orthodoxy

== See also ==
- Ecclesiastical polity, church government and structure
