= Tabernacle Township, New Jersey =

Township in Burlington County, New Jersey, US

- Township
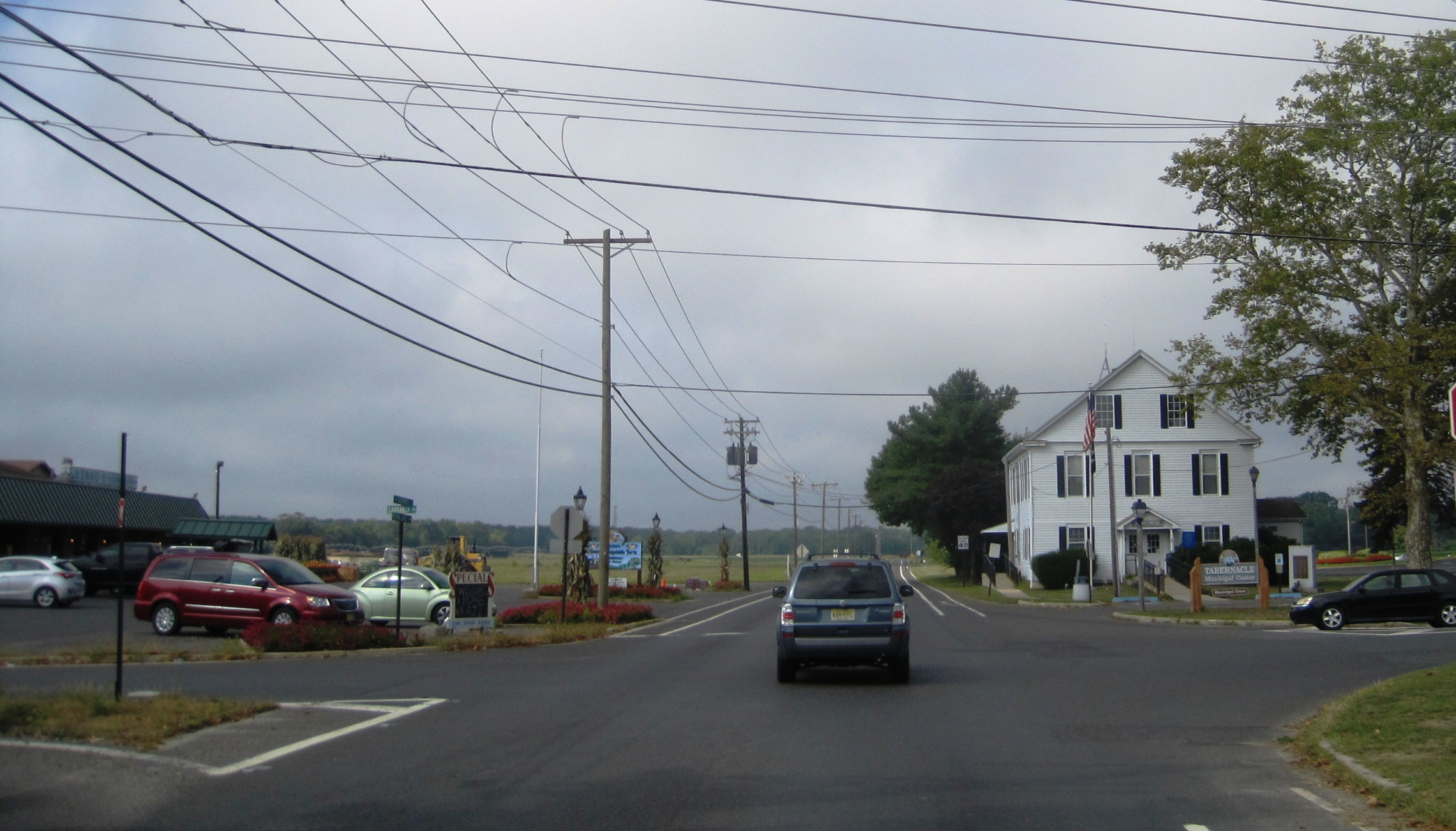
- Center of the township — The municipal building is in the foreground

- Seal
- Motto: Gateway to the Pines
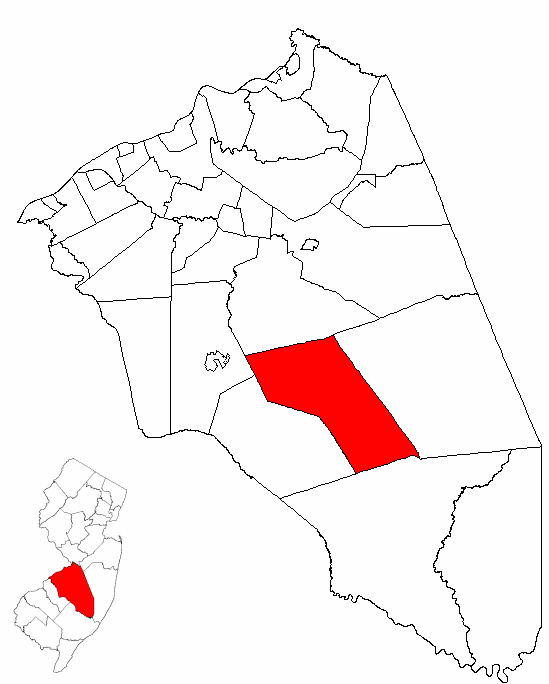
- Tabernacle Township highlighted in Burlington County. Inset map: Burlington County highlighted in the State of New Jersey.

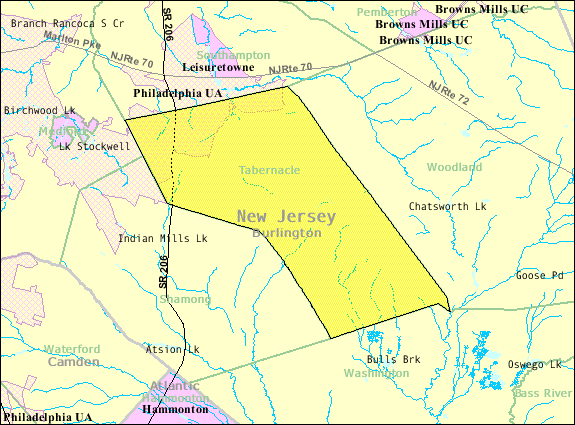
- Census Bureau map of Tabernacle Township, New Jersey

- Location in Burlington County Location in New Jersey Location in the United States
- Coordinates: 39.8206°N 74.6526°W
- Country: United States
- State: New Jersey
- County: Burlington
- Incorporated: March 22, 1901
- Named for: Tabernacle in the Wilderness Church

Government
  - Type: Township
  - Body: Township Committee
  - Mayor: Joseph Barton (R, term ends December 31, 2028)
  - Administrator: Maryalice Brown
  - Municipal clerk: Maryalice Brown

Area
  - Total: 49.63 sq mi (128.54 km^{2})
  - Land: 49.20 sq mi (127.43 km^{2})
  - Water: 0.43 sq mi (1.11 km^{2}) 0.86%
  - Rank: 33rd of 565 in state 5th of 40 in county
- Elevation: 69 ft (21 m)

Population (2020)
  - Total: 6,776
  - Estimate (2023): 6,877
  - Rank: 324th of 565 in state 24th of 40 in county
  - Density: 137.7/sq mi (53.2/km^{2})
  - Rank: 526th of 565 in state 36th of 40 in county
- Time zone: UTC−05:00 (Eastern (EST))
  - Summer (DST): UTC−04:00 (Eastern (EDT))
- ZIP Code: 08088
- Area code: 609 exchanges: 268, 801, 859
- FIPS code: 3400572060
- GNIS feature ID: 0882081
- Website: www.tabernacle-nj.gov

Tabernacle Township is a township in Burlington County, in the U.S. state of New Jersey. As of the 2020 United States census, the township's population was 6,776, a decrease of 173 (−2.5%) from the 2010 census count of 6,949, which in turn reflected a decline of 221 (−3.1%) from the 7,170 counted in the 2000 census. The township, and all of Burlington County, is a part of the Philadelphia metropolitan area.

Tabernacle was incorporated as a township by an act of the New Jersey Legislature on March 22, 1901, from portions of Shamong Township, Southampton Township and Woodland Township. The township was named for a tabernacle constructed by missionaries David and John Brainerd.

New Jersey Monthly magazine ranked Tabernacle Township as its 23rd best place to live in its 2008 rankings of the "Best Places To Live" in New Jersey. New Jersey Monthly magazine ranked Tabernacle Township as its sixth-best place to live in its 2010 rankings of the "Best Places To Live" in New Jersey. In 2009, it was rated the #1 small town by South Jersey Magazine.

== History ==
The area now known as Tabernacle was originally inhabited by the Lenape Native Americans. In 1778, John Brainerd established a Christian church called "Tabernacle in the Wilderness," with the aim of converting the local Native American population to Christianity. In 1803, William Wilkins sold land to 28 individuals for the creation of Tabernacle Cemetery, which was located adjacent to the church.

The church also served as a schoolhouse, but as the community expanded, a one-room schoolhouse was built in 1856 at the future location of Tabernacle Town Hall. A sawmill was constructed in the Friendship area in the early 1700s, and around 1860, Gilbert Knight built the Knight-Pepper House near the Town Hall. The property subsequently passed to the Scott and Pepper families, and upon the death of Clara Pepper in 1987, it was donated to the Tabernacle Historic Society. In the 1880s, the Tabernacle Methodist Episcopal Church was constructed on the original site, where it still stands today.

Tabernacle became an incorporated township on March 22, 1901, through an act of the New Jersey Legislature, incorporating portions of Shamong Township, Southampton Township, and Woodland Township.

On July 13, 1928, Emilio Carranza, known as the "Lindbergh of Mexico," tragically crashed in Tabernacle during a storm while flying from New York City to Mexico. The Carranza Memorial was erected in his memory, funded by Mexican schoolchildren, and Hampton Gates Road was subsequently renamed Carranza Road in his honor.

In 1909, the one-room schoolhouse was demolished and replaced by a two-room schoolhouse; it was relocated down the road in 1936, and two more rooms were added. In the 1950s, the Tabernacle Elementary School was constructed on New Road, and Olson Middle School (previously Tabernacle Middle School) was built across the road in 1968. Following the death of Kenneth R. Olson in 1990, the Tabernacle School District renamed the school in his honor. In 2003, Seneca High School was established to serve high school students from Tabernacle, Shamong, Southampton, and Woodland Townships.

In 1970, the population of Tabernacle was 2,103. By 1980, the population had nearly tripled to 6,236, reflecting the rapid suburbanization of the Philadelphia metropolitan area in South Jersey. The population peaked at 7,362 in 1990, but has been gradually decreasing since then, with 7,170 residents recorded in 2000, and 6,949 in the 2010 census.

== Geography ==
According to the United States Census Bureau, the township had a total area of 49.63 square miles (128.54 km^{2}), including 49.20 square miles (127.43 km^{2}) of land and 0.43 square miles (1.11 km^{2}) of water (0.86%).

Unincorporated communities, localities and place names located partially or completely within the township include Apple Pie Hill, Bozuretown, Carranza Memorial, Eagle, Fairview, Fox Chase, Friendship, Hampton Gate, Harris, Oriental, Paisley, Pine Crest, Sandy Ridge, Sooy Place, South Park, Speedwell and White Horse Station.

The township borders the Burlington County municipalities of Medford Township, Shamong Township, Southampton Township, Washington Township and Woodland Township.

The township is one of 56 South Jersey municipalities that are included within the New Jersey Pinelands National Reserve, a protected natural area of unique ecology covering 1,100,000 acres (450,000 ha), that has been classified as a United States Biosphere Reserve and established by Congress in 1978 as the nation's first National Reserve. All of the township is included in the state-designated Pinelands Area, which includes portions of Burlington County, along with areas in Atlantic, Camden, Cape May, Cumberland, Gloucester and Ocean counties.

== Demographics ==
Historical population
Census	Pop.	Note	%±
1910	487		—
1920	431		−11.5%
1930	460		6.7%
1940	490		6.5%
1950	1,034		111.0%
1960	1,621		56.8%
1970	2,103		29.7%
1980	6,236		196.5%
1990	7,360		18.0%
2000	7,170		−2.6%
2010	6,949		−3.1%
2020	6,776		−2.5%
2023 (est.)	6,877		1.5%
Population sources: 1910–2000; 1910–1920 1910 1910–1930; 1940–2000 2000; 2010 2020

=== 2010 census ===
The 2010 United States census counted 6,949 people, 2,375 households, and 1,978 families in the township. The population density was 141.5 per square mile (54.6/km^{2}). There were 2,445 housing units at an average density of 49.8 per square mile (19.2/km^{2}). The racial makeup was 95.80% (6,657) White, 1.38% (96) Black or African American, 0.07% (5) Native American, 0.69% (48) Asian, 0.06% (4) Pacific Islander, 0.94% (65) from other races, and 1.06% (74) from two or more races. Hispanic or Latino of any race were 2.76% (192) of the population.

Of the 2,375 households, 34.7% had children under the age of 18; 72.1% were married couples living together; 7.1% had a female householder with no husband present and 16.7% were non-families. Of all households, 13.4% were made up of individuals and 6.0% had someone living alone who was 65 years of age or older. The average household size was 2.92 and the average family size was 3.20.

24.1% of the population were under the age of 18, 8.1% from 18 to 24, 21.4% from 25 to 44, 35.3% from 45 to 64, and 11.2% who were 65 years of age or older. The median age was 42.8 years. For every 100 females, the population had 101.2 males. For every 100 females ages 18 and older there were 100.8 males.

The Census Bureau's 2006–2010 American Community Survey showed that (in 2010 inflation-adjusted dollars) median household income was $101,053 (with a margin of error of +/– $15,205) and the median family income was $107,179 (+/– $7,238). Males had a median income of $47,947 (+/– $13,091) versus $40,231 (+/– $18,026) for females. The per capita income for the borough was $36,726 (+/– $3,161). About 1.1% of families and 2.5% of the population were below the poverty line, including 0.4% of those under age 18 and none of those age 65 or over.

=== 2000 census ===
As of the 2000 United States census there were 7,170 people, 2,346 households, and 2,010 families residing in the township. The population density was 145.0 inhabitants per square mile (56.0/km^{2}). There were 2,385 housing units at an average density of 48.2 per square mile (18.6/km^{2}). The racial makeup of the township was 96.29% White, 2.09% African American, 0.10% Native American, 0.73% Asian, 0.31% from other races, and 0.49% from two or more races. Hispanic or Latino of any race were 1.48% of the population.

There were 2,346 households, out of which 41.6% had children under the age of 18 living with them, 77.6% were married couples living together, 5.2% had a female householder with no husband present, and 14.3% were non-families. 11.4% of all households were made up of individuals, and 4.7% had someone living alone who was 65 years of age or older. The average household size was 3.03 and the average family size was 3.28.

In the township the population was spread out, with 27.9% under the age of 18, 7.1% from 18 to 24, 28.2% from 25 to 44, 29.8% from 45 to 64, and 7.0% who were 65 years of age or older. The median age was 38 years. For every 100 females, there were 102.7 males. For every 100 females age 18 and over, there were 100.5 males.

The median income for a household in the township was $76,432, and the median income for a family was $86,729. Males had a median income of $58,148 versus $31,250 for females. The per capita income for the township was $27,874. About 1.1% of families and 2.0% of the population were below the Poverty threshold, including 1.1% of those under age 18 and 6.0% of those age 65 or over.

== Parks and recreation ==
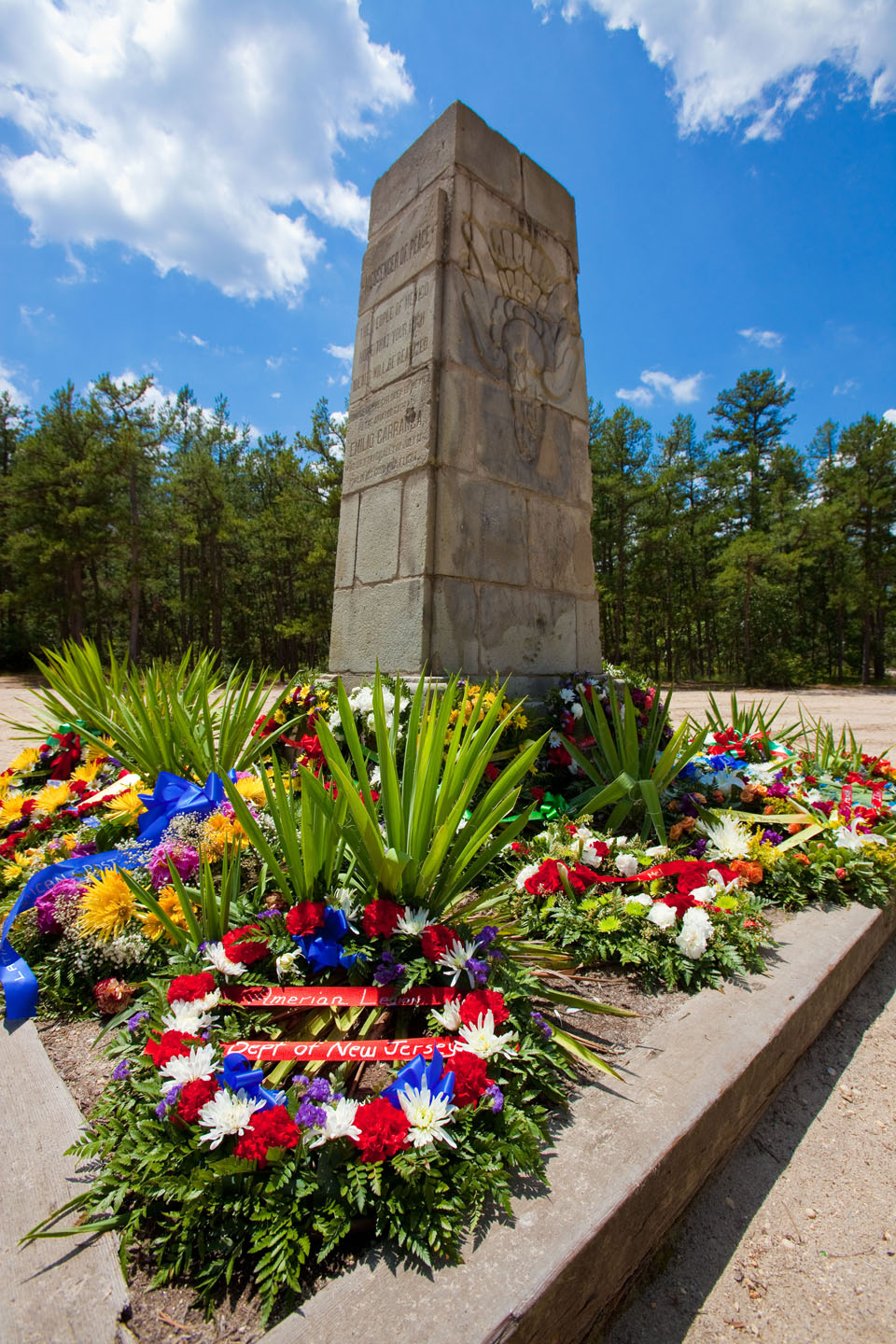
Carranza Memorial

- Carranza Memorial – A 12-foot (3.7 m) memorial in the Wharton State Forest that marks the site of the July 13, 1928, crash of Emilio Carranza, known as "The Lindbergh of Mexico". The memorial, installed with funds donated by Mexican schoolchildren, depicts a falling eagle of Aztec design. Every July on the Saturday nearest the anniversary of his crash (second Saturday in July) at 1:00 p.m., he is honored at the memorial site by local residents and representatives from the Mexican consulates in New York City and Philadelphia.
- Delanco Camp – An inter-denominational Christian camp meeting and summer camp along Lake Agape, located here since 1964, preaching under the Wesleyan doctrine.
- The Batona Trail – A hiking trail that extends for 49.5 miles (79.7 km), with significant portions running through Tabernacle Township.
- Apple Pie Hill is the highest point in the Pine Barrens and one of the highest in South Jersey, standing 205 feet (62 m) above sea level, with a 60-foot (18 m) fire tower providing panoramic views across much of the region. In September 2016, chronic vandalism led the New Jersey Department of Environmental Protection to eliminate access to Apple Pie Hill by erecting a fence around the tower; access is possible when New Jersey Forest Fire Service Division personnel are at the site.

== Government ==
=== Local government ===
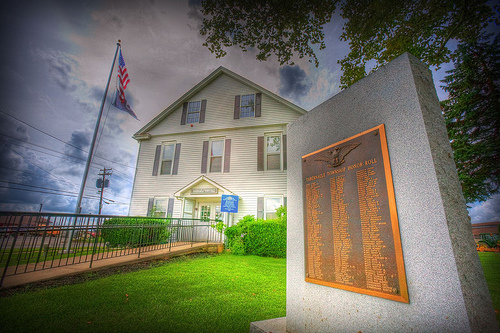

Tabernacle Township is governed under the Township form of New Jersey municipal government, one of 141 municipalities (of the 564) statewide that use this form, the second-most commonly used form of government in the state. The Township Committee is comprised of five members, who are elected directly by the voters at-large in partisan elections to serve three-year terms of office on a staggered basis, with either one or two seats coming up for election each year as part of the November general election in a three-year cycle. At an annual reorganization meeting held during the first week of January after each election, the Township Committee selects one of its members to serve as Mayor and another as Deputy Mayor.

As of 2023, members of the Tabernacle Township Committee are Mayor Samuel R. Moore III (R, term on committee ends December 31, 2024; term as mayor ends 2023), Deputy Mayor Mark Hartman (R, elected to serve an unexpired term on committee that ends 2023; term as deputy mayor ends 2023), Kimberly A. Brown (R, 2023), Noble McNaughton (R,2025;appointed to serve an unexpired term), William J. Sprague Jr. (R, 2025).

The township committee appointed Noble McNaughton in February 2023 to fill the seat expiring in December 2025 that had been held by Robert C. Sunbury.

In January 2022, the Township Committee appointed Mark Hartman to fill the seat expiring in December 2024 that had been held Matthew Baals until he resigned the previous month, shortly after taking office, citing "time commitment issues". Hartman served on an interim basis until the November 2022 general election, when he was elected to serve the balance of the term of office.

The township is patrolled by Troop C of the New Jersey State Police at the Red Lion Barracks in Southampton Township.

=== Federal, state, and county representation ===
Tabernacle Township is located in the 3rd Congressional District and is part of New Jersey's 8th state legislative district.

For the 119th United States Congress, New Jersey's 3rd congressional district is currently represented Herb Conaway (D, Delran Township). New Jersey is represented in the United States Senate by Democrats Cory Booker (Newark, term ends 2027) and Andy Kim (Moorestown, term ends 2031).

For the 2026–2027 session, the 8th legislative district of the New Jersey Legislature is represented in the New Jersey Senate by Latham Tiver (R, Southampton Township) and in the General Assembly by Anthony Angelozzi (D, Hammonton) and Andrea Katz (D, Chesterfield Township).

Burlington County is governed by a Board of County Commissioners comprised of five members who are chosen at-large in partisan elections to serve three-year terms of office on a staggered basis, with either one or two seats coming up for election each year; at an annual reorganization meeting, the board selects a director and deputy director from among its members to serve a one-year term. As of 2026, Burlington County's Commissioners are: Director Felicia Hopson (D, Willingboro Township, term as commissioner ends December 31, 2027; term as director ends 2026), Deputy Director Allison Eckel (D, Medford, term as commissioner ends 2028; term as deputy director ends 2026), Randy Brolo (D, Lumberton, 2026; elected to an unexpired term), Tyler Burrell (D, Delran Township, 2027) and Tom Pullion (D, Edgewater Park, 2026).

Burlington County's constitutional officers are Clerk Joanne Schwartz (D, Southampton Township, 2028), Sheriff James H. Kostoplis (D, Bordentown, 2028) and Surrogate Brian J. Carlin (D, Burlington Township, 2026).

=== Politics ===
United States presidential election results for Tabernacle Township 2024 2020 2016 2012 2008 2004
Year	Republican		Democratic		Third party(ies)	
Year	No.	%	No.	%	No.	%
2024	2,722	62.22%	1,588	36.30%	65	1.49%
2020	2,735	60.80%	1,676	37.26%	87	1.93%
2016	2,396	62.59%	1,271	33.20%	161	4.21%
2012	2,247	58.81%	1,525	39.91%	49	1.28%
2008	2,216	56.76%	1,635	41.88%	53	1.36%
2004	2,345	59.61%	1,544	39.25%	45	1.14%

As of March 2011, there were a total of 5,022 registered voters in Tabernacle Township, of which 981 (19.5% vs. 33.3% countywide) were registered as Democrats, 1,916 (38.2% vs. 23.9%) were registered as Republicans and 2,122 (42.3% vs. 42.8%) were registered as Unaffiliated. There were 3 voters registered as Libertarians or Greens. Among the township's 2010 Census population, 72.3% (vs. 61.7% in Burlington County) were registered to vote, including 95.2% of those ages 18 and over (vs. 80.3% countywide).

In the 2012 presidential election, Republican Mitt Romney received 2,247 votes here (58.4% vs. 40.2% countywide), ahead of Democrat Barack Obama with 1,525 votes (39.6% vs. 58.1%) and other candidates with 49 votes (1.3% vs. 1.0%), among the 3,848 ballots cast by the township's 5,202 registered voters, for a turnout of 74.0% (vs. 74.5% in Burlington County). In the 2008 presidential election, Republican John McCain received 2,216 votes here (56.4% vs. 39.9% countywide), ahead of Democrat Barack Obama with 1,635 votes (41.6% vs. 58.4%) and other candidates with 53 votes (1.3% vs. 1.0%), among the 3,926 ballots cast by the township's 4,978 registered voters, for a turnout of 78.9% (vs. 80.0% in Burlington County). In the 2004 presidential election, Republican George W. Bush received 2,345 votes here (59.4% vs. 46.0% countywide), ahead of Democrat John Kerry with 1,544 votes (39.1% vs. 52.9%) and other candidates with 45 votes (1.1% vs. 0.8%), among the 3,950 ballots cast by the township's 4,991 registered voters, for a turnout of 79.1% (vs. 78.8% in the whole county).

Gubernatorial election results for Tabernacle Township
Year	Republican		Democratic		Third party(ies)	
Year	No.	%	No.	%	No.	%
2025	2,243	62.57%	1,323	36.90%	19	0.53%
2021	2,091	68.36%	950	31.06%	18	0.59%
2017	1,362	61.49%	816	36.84%	37	1.67%
2013	1,850	75.73%	557	22.80%	36	1.47%
2009	1,682	64.10%	788	30.03%	154	5.87%
2005	1,435	59.72%	833	34.67%	135	5.62%

In the 2013 New Jersey gubernatorial election, Republican Chris Christie received 1,850 votes here (74.5% vs. 61.4% countywide), ahead of Democrat Barbara Buono with 557 votes (22.4% vs. 35.8%) and other candidates with 36 votes (1.4% vs. 1.2%), among the 2,484 ballots cast by the township's 5,150 registered voters, yielding a 48.2% turnout (vs. 44.5% in the county). In the 2009 gubernatorial election, Republican Chris Christie received 1,682 votes here (63.8% vs. 47.7% countywide), ahead of Democrat Jon Corzine with 778 votes (29.5% vs. 44.5%), Independent Chris Daggett with 127 votes (4.8% vs. 4.8%) and other candidates with 27 votes (1.0% vs. 1.2%), among the 2,636 ballots cast by the township's 5,009 registered voters, yielding a 52.6% turnout (vs. 44.9% in the county).

United States Senate election results for Tabernacle Township1
Year	Republican		Democratic		Third party(ies)	
Year	No.	%	No.	%	No.	%
2024	2,526	59.41%	1,664	39.13%	62	1.46%
2018	2,084	65.04%	990	30.90%	130	4.06%
2012	2,165	59.10%	1,465	39.99%	33	0.90%
2006	1,428	60.61%	860	36.50%	68	2.89%

United States Senate election results for Tabernacle Township2
Year	Republican		Democratic		Third party(ies)	
Year	No.	%	No.	%	No.	%
2020	2,712	61.66%	1,607	36.54%	79	1.80%
2014	1,382	66.67%	645	31.11%	46	2.22%
2013	1,038	69.48%	435	29.12%	21	1.41%
2008	2,164	60.11%	1,382	38.39%	54	1.50%

== Education ==
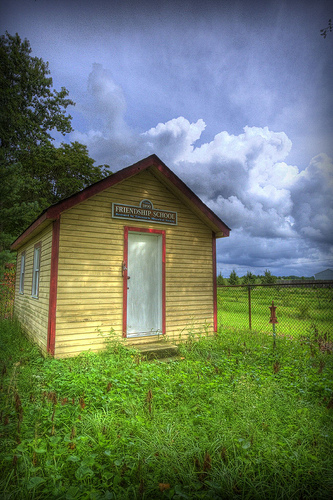
Friendship School

The Tabernacle School District serves public school students in pre-kindergarten through eighth grade. As of the 2020–21 school year, the district, comprised of two schools, had an enrollment of 658 students and 53.4 classroom teachers (on an FTE basis), for a student–teacher ratio of 12.3:1. Schools in the district (with 2020–21 enrollment data from the National Center for Education Statistics) are Tabernacle Elementary School with students in Pre-K–4 and Kenneth R. Olson Middle School with students in grades 5–8.

Public school students in Tabernacle Township in ninth through twelfth grades attend Seneca High School located in Tabernacle Township, which serves students in ninth through twelfth grade from Shamong, Southampton, Tabernacle and Woodland Townships. The school is part of the Lenape Regional High School District, which also serves students from Evesham Township, Medford Lakes, Medford Township, Mount Laurel Township, Shamong Township and Woodland Township. As of the 2020–21 school year, the high school had an enrollment of 1,073 students and 103.6 classroom teachers (on an FTE basis), for a student–teacher ratio of 10.4:1.

Students from Tabernacle Township, and from all of Burlington County, are eligible to attend the Burlington County Institute of Technology, a countywide public school district that serves the vocational and technical education needs of students at the high school and post-secondary level at its campuses in Medford and Westampton.

== Transportation ==
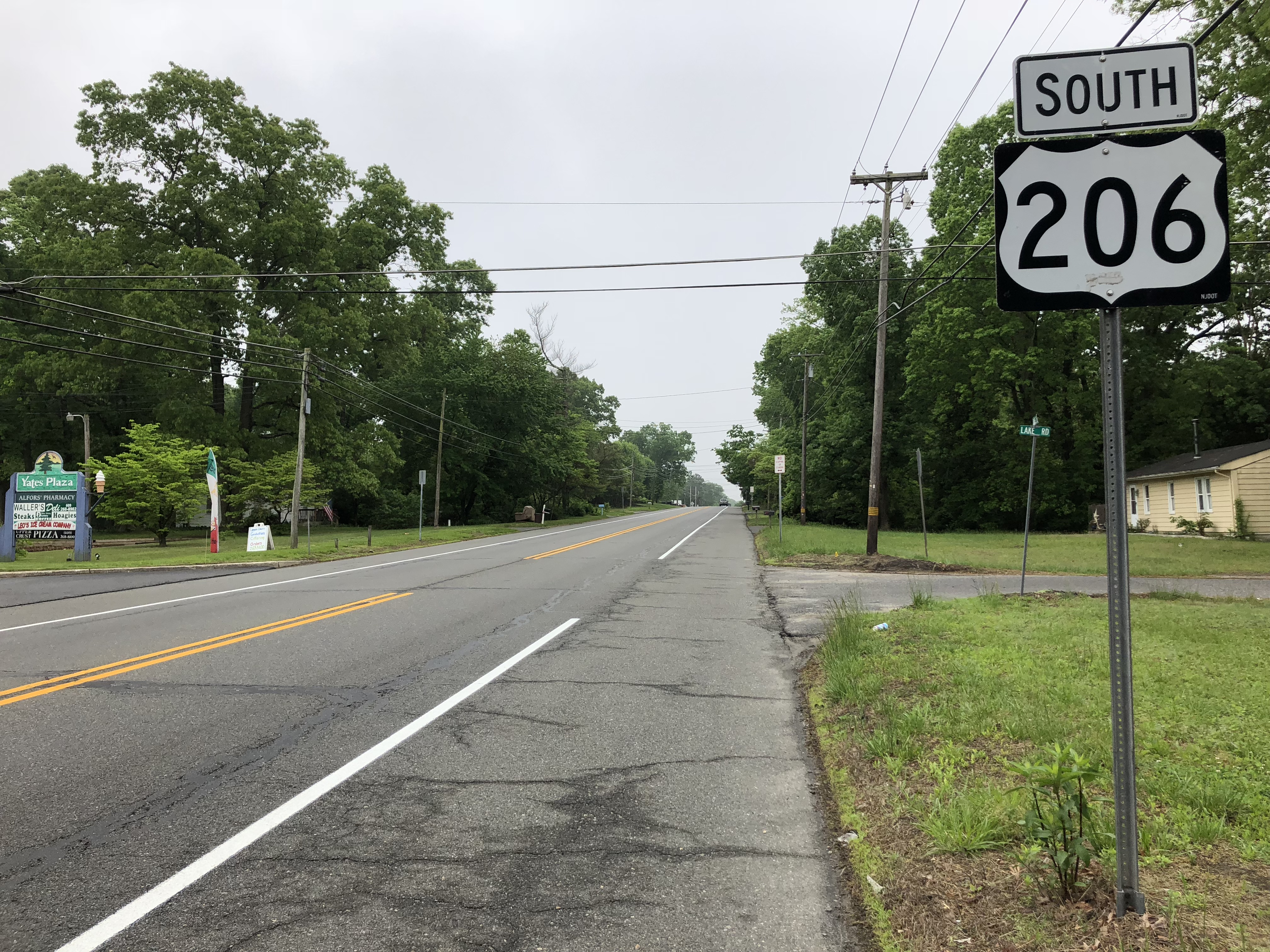
U.S. Route 206 in Tabernacle Township

As of May 2010, the township had a total of 89.17 miles (143.51 km) of roadways, of which 71.63 miles (115.28 km) were maintained by the municipality, 14.00 miles (22.53 km) by Burlington County and 3.54 miles (5.70 km) by the New Jersey Department of Transportation.

The two major roads that pass through are County Route 532 through the central part and U.S. Route 206 in the west.

The Atlantic City Expressway, Garden State Parkway, Interstate 295 and New Jersey Turnpike are all accessible two towns away.

There are only two traffic lights in Tabernacle, both on U.S. Route 206.

== Notable people ==
People who were born in, residents of, or otherwise closely associated with Tabernacle Township include:

- Howard P. Boyd (1914–2011), scientist who has specialized in the study of the Pine Barrens
- Sean Doolittle (born 1986), Major League Baseball relief pitcher for the Washington Nationals
- Shana Hiatt (born 1975), model and host of Poker After Dark
- Justin Murphy (born 1965), former committeeman and deputy mayor of Tabernacle Township and the Republican nominee in the U.S. Senate election in New Jersey in 2026
- Brandon Taylor (born 1994), professional basketball player for Jämtland Basket of the Basketligan
