= Tabernacle School District =

School district in Burlington County, New Jersey, US

Address
- 132 New Road Tabernacle Township, Burlington County, New Jersey, 08088; United States
- Coordinates: 39.777767°N 74.744754°W

District information
- Grades: K-8
- Superintendent: Shaun Banin
- Business administrator: Patricia Palmieri
- Schools: 2

Students and staff
- Enrollment: 658 (as of 2020–21)
- Faculty: 53.4 FTEs
- Student–teacher ratio: 12.3:1

Other information
- District Factor Group: GH
- Website: www.tabschools.org
Ind.	Per pupil	District spending	Rank (*)	K-8 average	%± vs. average
1A	Total Spending	$18,737	67	$18,891	−0.8%
1	Budgetary Cost	15,177	65	14,159	7.2%
2	Classroom Instruction	8,942	57	8,659	3.3%
6	Support Services	2,438	60	2,167	12.5%
8	Administrative Cost	1,705	60	1,547	10.2%
10	Operations & Maintenance	1,809	66	1,612	12.2%
13	Extracurricular Activities	143	75	104	37.5%
16	Median Teacher Salary	60,696	39	61,136
Data from NJDoE 2014 Taxpayers' Guide to Education Spending. *Of K-8 districts with more than 750 students. Lowest spending=1; Highest=84

The Tabernacle School District is a community public school district that serves students in pre-kindergarten through eighth grade from Tabernacle Township, in Burlington County, in the U.S. state of New Jersey.

As of the 2020–21 school year, the district, comprising two schools, had an enrollment of 658 students and 53.4 classroom teachers (on an FTE basis), for a student–teacher ratio of 12.3:1.

The district is classified by the New Jersey Department of Education as being in District Factor Group "GH", the third-highest of eight groupings. District Factor Groups organize districts statewide to allow comparison by common socioeconomic characteristics of the local districts. From lowest socioeconomic status to highest, the categories are A, B, CD, DE, FG, GH, I and J.

Public school students in Tabernacle Township in ninth through twelfth grades attend Seneca High School located in Tabernacle Township, which serves students in ninth through twelfth grade from Shamong, Southampton, Tabernacle and Woodland Townships. The school is part of the Lenape Regional High School District, which also serves students from Evesham Township, Medford Lakes, Medford Township, Mount Laurel Township, Shamong Township and Woodland Township. As of the 2020–21 school year, the high school had an enrollment of 1,073 students and 103.6 classroom teachers (on an FTE basis), for a student–teacher ratio of 10.4:1.

== Schools ==
Schools in the district (with 2020–21 enrollment data from the National Center for Education Statistics) are:

Elementary school

- Tabernacle Elementary School with students in PreK-4
  - Shaun Banin, principal

Middle school

- Kenneth R. Olson Middle School with students in grades 5-8
  - Shaun Banin, principal

== Administration ==
Core members of the district's administration are:

- Shaun Banin, superintendent
- Patricia Palmieri, business administrator

== Board of education ==
The district's board of education, composed of nine members, sets policy and oversees the fiscal and educational operation of the district through its administration. As a Type II school district, the board's trustees are elected directly by voters to serve three-year terms of office on a staggered basis, with three seats up for election each year held (since 2012) as part of the November general election. The board appoints a superintendent to oversee the district's day-to-day operations and a business administrator to supervise the business functions of the district.
