= Baháʼí Faith and education =

The theme of education in the Baháʼí Faith is given emphasis. Its literature gives a principle of universal and compulsory education, which is identified as one of key principles alongside monotheism and the unity of humanity.

Baháʼu'lláh, the founder of the Baháʼí Faith wrote:

"Regard man as a mine rich in gems of inestimable value. Education can, alone, cause it to reveal its treasures, and enable mankind to benefit therefrom."

Baháʼu'lláh, Tablets of Baháʼu'lláh, p. 161.

The Baháʼí teachings focus on promoting a moral and spiritual education, in addition to the arts, trades, sciences and professions. The emphasis on education is a means for social and national improvement. Since all Baháʼís have the duty to do work that is useful to humanity, Baháʼí education is meant to prepare Baháʼís to perform such work.

== Purpose ==
One purpose of universal compulsory education is implied in the Baháʼí Short Obligatory Prayer which states that the God's primary reason for creating humanity is so that each of us would come to know and love Him. Clearly one purpose of education would be to facilitate this process. But religious education, however critical, should not lead to division and conflict. Baháʼu'lláh writes:

"Schools must first train the children in the principles of religion, so that the Promise and the Threat recorded in the Books of God may prevent them from the things forbidden and adorn them with the mantle of the commandments; but this in such a measure that it may not injure the children by resulting in ignorant fanaticism and bigotry."

Baháʼu'lláh, Tablets of Baháʼu'lláh, p. 67.

This principle is most commonly applied by Baháʼís in the form of social-welfare projects and children's classes. The emphasis on education as a means for social and national improvement is shown in the following quote by ʻAbdu'l-Bahá, the son and appointed successor of Baháʼu'lláh:

"The primary, the most urgent requirement is the promotion of education. It is inconceivable that any nation should achieve prosperity and success unless this paramount, this fundamental concern is carried forward. The principal reason for the decline and fall of peoples is ignorance. Today the mass of the people are uninformed even as to ordinary affairs, how much less do they grasp the core of the important problems and complex needs of the time."

ʻAbdu'l-Bahá, The Secret of Divine Civilization, p. 109.

== Type of education ==
The type of education that is written about in the Baháʼí writings does not point to one particular type or method of education.

=== Moral and spiritual education ===
The Baháʼí teachings focus on promoting a moral and spiritual education, in addition to the arts, trades, sciences and professions.

"Training in morals and good conduct is far more important than book learning. A child that is cleanly, agreeable, of good character, well-behaved even though he be ignorant is preferable to a child that is rude, unwashed, ill-natured, and yet becoming deeply versed in all the sciences and arts. The reason for this is that the child who conducts himself well, even though he be ignorant, is of benefit to others, while an ill-natured, ill-behaved child is corrupted and harmful to others, even though he be learned. If, however, the child be trained to be both learned and good, the result is light upon light."

ʻAbdu'l-Bahá, Selections from the Writings of ʻAbdu'l-Bahá, Sec. 110, pp. 135-136.

Children, and the requirement to give them a proper education, is particularly emphasized in many of the Baháʼí writings. Children's classes have become common-place in most Baháʼí communities, and were named by the Universal House of Justice in 2001 as one of the four core activities that Baháʼís should focus on.

Baháʼí individuals have created the noted book The Family Virtues Guide, which is dedicated to the spiritual education of children. Its multi-religious content has brought it enough popularity to sell over 100,000 copies and to win the authors an interview on The Oprah Winfrey Show.

=== A useful trade or profession ===
All Baháʼís have the duty to do work that is useful to humanity. A major goal of Baháʼí education is therefore to prepare Baháʼís to perform such work.

This is by no means the only goal (as the categories above and below indicate), or even necessarily the overriding one, but Baháʼís are warned against courses of study which "begin and end in words":

"The learned of the day must direct the people to acquire those branches of knowledge which are of use, that both the learned themselves and the generality of mankind may derive benefits therefrom. Such academic pursuits as begin and end in words alone have never been and will never be of any worth. The majority of Persia's learned doctors devote all their lives to the study of a philosophy the ultimate yield of which is nothing but words."

Baháʼu'lláh, Tablets of Baháʼu'lláh Revealed after the Kitáb-i-Aqdas, p. 169.

=== Literacy ===
The seventh Ishráq of Baháʼu'lláh's Ishráqat stipulates as follows:

"Unto every father hath been enjoined the instruction of his son and daughter in the art of reading and writing... "

While there do exist a number of preliterate or non-literate cultures, Baháʼís assume the spread of literacy to be one of the signs of an "ever-advancing civilization." For example, a priesthood is not needed in this era because the ability to read and write is no longer restricted to a professional class, with the masses reduced to auditors of their sacred texts.

=== Languages ===
Baháʼís expect the world's governments to one day cooperate in selecting an international auxiliary language to be used in global communication. After this is done, that language, along with one's mother tongue will be taught in schools all over the world.

"It is incumbent upon all nations... to convene a gathering and through joint consultation choose one language from among the varied existing languages, or create a new one, to be taught to the children in all the schools of the world."

Baháʼu'lláh, Tablets of Baháʼu'lláh, p. 165.

Although Baháʼu'lláh rued the necessity of spending many years learning multiple languages, when only one could be selected, various authoritative writings do assume foreign languages to be included among the "useful subjects" which Baháʼís will probably study.

=== Other subjects ===
The Baháʼí Faith has not yet endeavored to describe an ideal school curriculum, though its writings assume the usefulness of a wide variety of subjects.

"You have asked him [Shoghi Effendi] for detailed information concerning the Baháʼí educational programme: there is as yet no such thing as a Baháʼí curriculum, and there are no Baháʼí publications exclusively devoted to this subject, since the teachings of Baháʼu'lláh and ʻAbdu'l-Bahá do not present a definite and detailed educational system, but simply offer certain basic principles and set forth a number of teaching ideals that should guide future Baháʼí educationalists in their efforts to formulate an adequate teaching curriculum which would be in full harmony with the spirit of the Baháʼí Teachings, and would thus meet the requirements and needs of the modern age.

"These basic principles are available in the sacred writings of the Cause, and should be carefully studied, and gradually incorporated in various college and university programmes. But the task of formulating a system of education which would be officially recognized by the Cause, and enforced as such throughout the Baháʼí world is one which the present-day generation of believers cannot obviously undertake, and which has to be gradually accomplished by Baháʼí scholars and educationalists of the future."

From a letter dated 7 June 1939 written on behalf of Shoghi Effendi to an individual believer.

Baháʼí writings variously allude to mathematics, science, technology, commerce, industry, the liberal arts, and religion as suitable subjects for inclusion in an educational curriculum.

== Pedagogical issues ==
In education theory, in addition to what is taught, it is also important to note how education is taught. In addition to the traditional mode of education, other forms of education exist such as alternative schools, unschooling, homeschooling, Montessori, and Waldorf education. The Baháʼí requirements for education do not necessarily reject any of these possibilities.

=== Responsibility ===
The father is attributed with the responsibility for every child's education and should he fail to execute his responsibility to educate his children he can be compelled and even lose his rights as father. Mothers are acknowledged as the "first educators" of humanity, and their responsibility is equally confirmed. Beyond this, responsibility also falls to the community as a whole, as embodied in its Baháʼí institutions:

"Among the sacred obligations devolving upon the Spiritual Assemblies is the promotion of learning, the establishing of schools and creation of the necessary academic equipment and facilities for every boy and girl."

From a letter dated 8 June 1925 written by Shoghi Effendi to the National Spiritual Assembly of Persia.

In the unfortunate event that parents and/or their communities cannot educate all their children, Baháʼí law stipulates that girls are to be given priority over boys.

=== Environmental factors ===
ʻAbdu'l-Bahá wrote about school uniforms, cleanliness and courtesy:

"As to the organization of the schools: If possible the children should all wear the same kind of clothing, even if the fabric is varied. It is preferable that the fabric as well should be uniform; if, however, this is not possible, there is no harm done. The more cleanly the pupils are, the better; they should be immaculate. The school must be located in a place where the air is delicate and pure. The children must be carefully trained to be most courteous and well-behaved. They must be constantly encouraged and made eager to gain all the summits of human accomplishment, so that from their earliest years they will be taught to have high aims, to conduct themselves well, to be chaste, pure, and undefiled, and will learn to be of powerful resolve and firm of purpose in all things. Let them not jest and trifle, but earnestly advance unto their goals, so that in every situation they will be found resolute and firm."

ʻAbdu'l-Bahá, Selections from the Writings of Abdu'l-Bahá, p. 135.

== Baháʼí education in practice ==
Among the four core activities that Baháʼís are currently urged to focus on, supporting children's classes, Junior youth spiritual empowerment program and engaging in a sequence of courses known as study circles has become part of the community life of Baháʼís around the world.

=== Ruhi sequence of courses ===
The most common sequence is called Ruhi (meaning: of the spirit), which was originally developed in Colombia and currently consists of 14 courses, with the themes from the Baháʼí writings of prayer, education, history, family life, social action and participation in prevalent discourses of the society.

The following sequence of courses is:

- Book 1: Reflections on the Life of the Spirit
- Book 2: Arising to Serve
- Book 3: Children's Classes, Grade 1
- Book 4: The Twin Manifestations
- Book 5: releasing the potential of Junior youth
- Book 6: Teaching the Cause
- Book 7: Walking Together on a Path of Service
- Book 8: The Eternal Covenant
- Book 9: A Historical Perspective
- Book 10: Building Vibrant Communities
- Book 11: Material Means
- Book 12: The Family Life
- Book 13: Social Action
- Book 14: Participating in prevalent discourses of society

=== Core curriculum ===
The United States has developed a set of curriculum for children's classes known as the core curriculum.

=== Fundamental verities ===
Another sequence of courses uses for education of the Baháʼí teachings is called Fundamental Verities. This sequence was developed in the United States, and is not as common as the more widely used Ruhi sequence.

=== Baháʼí House of Worship ===
The Baháʼí House of Worship is an institution alluded to in the writings of the Baháʼí Faith. In its entirety, it represents a temple for worship, hospital, university, hospice, and other humanitarian and educational structures. It will serve as the city center for future Baháʼí societies.

=== Social and economic development ===
Some of the more mature and able Baháʼí communities around the world have taken on the task of Social and Economic Development (SED) projects. These can vary from place to place depending on the needs of different areas. Some examples include programs for the free education of migrant workers, the employment of the homeless, or the support of displaced refugees. Individuals have also worked to reform educational practices in society, such as Dr. Dwight W. Allen, a Baháʼí, who co-authored American Schools: The 100 Billion Dollar Challenge with William H. Cosby, Jr in 2000; and the work of Dr. Daniel Jordan in the ANISA Educational Model. The Baháʼís of the world have set up more than 300 academic "Baháʼí schools" around the world.

== Praise for teachers ==
The Baháʼí writings give a high praise for teachers, and, in the case that no personal will has been written, provide that some of a person's inheritance goes to their teachers.

"Having attained the stage of fulfilment and reached his maturity, man standeth in need of wealth, and such wealth as he acquireth through crafts or professions is commendable and praiseworthy in the estimation of men of wisdom, and especially in the eyes of servants who dedicate themselves to the education of the world and to the edification of its peoples. They are, in truth, cup-bearers of the life-giving water of knowledge and guides unto the ideal way. They direct the peoples of the world to the straight path and acquaint them with that which is conducive to human upliftment and exaltation. The straight path is the one which guideth man to the dayspring of perception and to the dawning-place of true understanding and leadeth him to that which will redound to glory, honour and greatness.

Baháʼu'lláh, Tablets of Baháʼu'lláh, p. 34.

== Bibliography ==
- Linda Kavelin-Popov, Dan Popov & John Kavelin (1997). The Family Virtues Guide: Simple Ways to Bring out the Best in our Children and Ourselves. Penguin Books of Canada Ltd. ISBN 0-452-27810-4.
- Handal, Boris. The philosophy of Baháʼí education. Religion and Education, (34)1, 48-62, 2007.
