= Maneckji Limji Hataria =

19th-century Indian Zoroastrian scholar and social activist

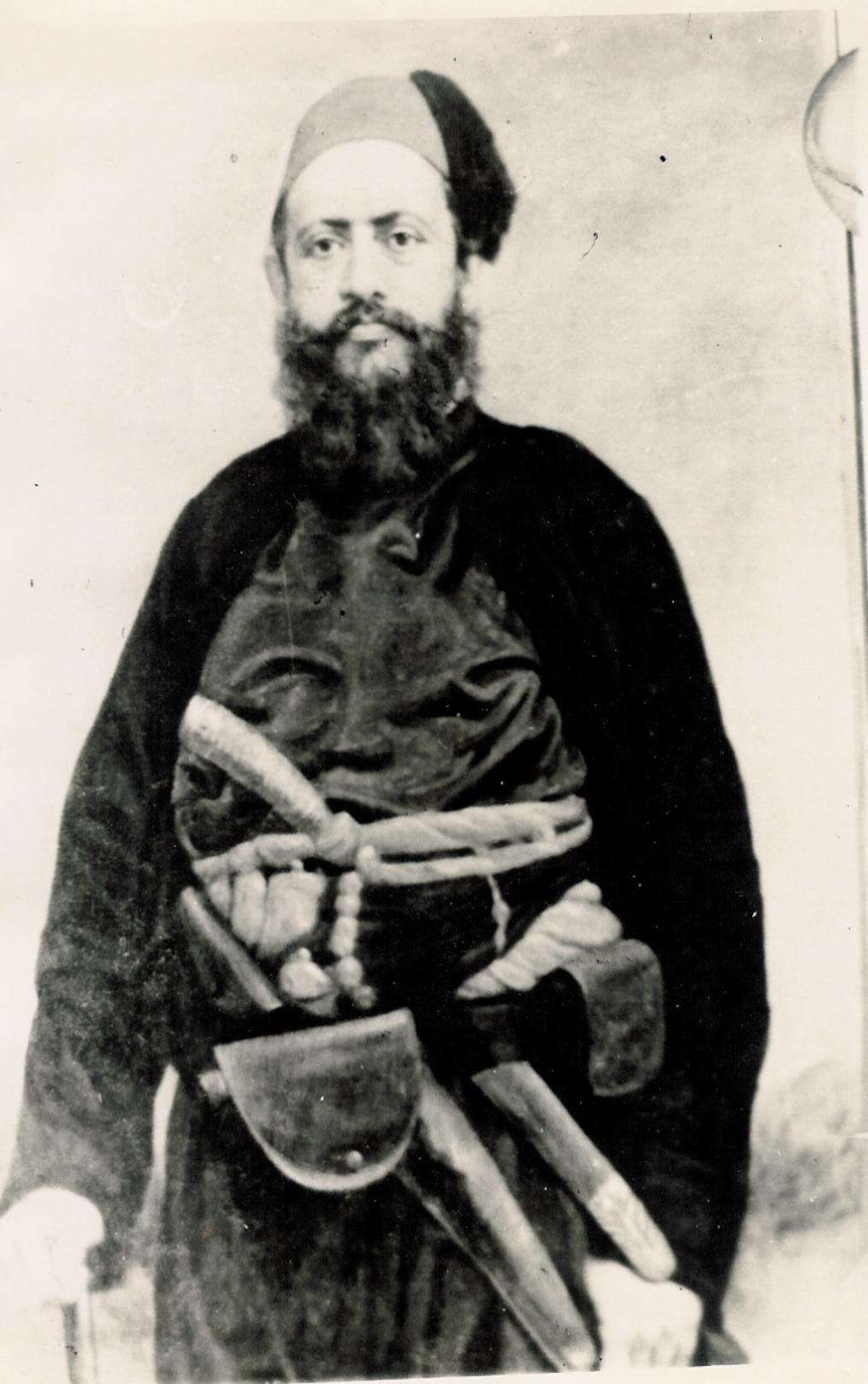
- Born: 2 January 1813; Mora Sumali, Surat district, British India
- Died: 15 February 1890 (aged 77); Tehran
- Occupation: Civil rights activist
- Spouses: Hirabayi; Farangis Hormazdyār Ḵosrobandar
- Children: 2

Maneckji Limji Hataria (1813–1890) was an Indian scholar and civil rights activist of Parsi Zoroastrian descent, who took up the cause of the Zoroastrians of Iran.

== Early life ==
Maneckji was born at the village of Mora Sumali near Surat, in Gujarat, India in 1813; and as he himself tells, earned his own bread from the age of fifteen, traveling widely as a commercial agent in India. By the time of his appointment, he was already experienced, self-reliant and resourceful, and his choice by the Society proved a wholly admirable one. He is remembered among the Zoroastrians of Iran, for whom he was to labor, with only one brief intermission from then until his death in 1890.

== Activities in Iran ==
In 1854 Hataria was appointed emissary by the "Persian Zoroastrian Amelioration Fund", an organization founded in Bombay by Dinshaw Maneckji Petit with the aim of improving the conditions for the less fortunate co-religionists in Iran, who were being persecuted by the Qajar rulers.

In Yazd, Hataria established a Council of Zoroastrians, which succeeded in convincing a number of Iranian Zoroastrians to emigrate to India (where they are today known as Parsis). Hataria may also have been instrumental in obtaining a remission of the jizya poll tax for his co-religionists in 1882.

Manekji preached the advantages of collective social work and communal unity. He urged the Zoroastrians of Yazd and Kerman to form anjuman societies, based somewhat on the pattern of the Bombay Parsi Panchayet. Reports of early activities, sent by Manekji to Bombay, show that amongst other matters, the Kerman society attended to the restoration of the fire temple there. Similarly, hearing of the efforts of Manekji, the Bombay Parsis (led by Baronet Dinshaw Maneckji Petit, whose wife Sakarbai Petit (née Pandey) was from her mother's side of Iranian ancestry) collected funds for the repair of the Yazd Atash Behram (not the same as the present one, which dates to 1932). A bust of Manekji stands in the entrance gallery of the present-day Atash Behram at Yazd.

He founded the first boys-only school for the small community in Tehran in 1860, and later in Yazd and Kerman with money from the Amelioration Society. By 1882 there were, twelve Zoroastrian schools providing secular, Western-style education. He also brought in Parsi teachers from India to teach the Zoroastrian boys and girls in Iran. This enabled them to enhance their lives, and laid the knowledge framework for the community’s future prosperity, as well as political participation, and re-entry into the broader Iranian society

== Association with thinkers and writers of Nasseri era ==
Maneckji Limji Hataria was the first envoy of Indian Parsis with the history of being interested in Iran and ancient relics of Iran as well as being affected by Neo Zoroastrian or Dasatiri text entered Iran. Despite his first mission was ameliorating the situation of Zoroastrian lives in Iran, but because of the reasons which were mentioned, a little later he was linked to the scholars and writers of Iran in Nasseri era.

In 1854 Hataria met Bahá'u'lláh, the founder of the Bahá'í Faith, in Baghdad. Although he remained faithful to Zoroastrianism all his life, he became a lifelong admirer of the new religion. Between 1876 and 1882 Mírzá Abu'l-Fadl, a well-known Bahá'í scholar, was Hataria's personal secretary, and acted as his intermediary with Bahá'u'lláh. During this period, at the request of Hataria, Bahá'u'lláh wrote two tablets in pure Persian, which have been published under the title Tabernacle of Unity.
