= Outline of the Baháʼí Faith =

Overview of and topical guide to the Baháʼí Faith

The following outline is provided as an overview of and topical guide to the Baháʼí Faith.

Baháʼí Faith – relatively new religion teaching the essential worth of all religions and the unity of all people, established by Baháʼu'lláh in the 19th-century Middle East and now estimated to have a worldwide following of 5–8 million adherents, known as Baháʼís.

== Beliefs and practices ==
=== Baháʼí teachings ===
Baháʼí teachings

- God in the Baháʼí Faith
- Baháʼí Faith and the unity of religion – the Baháʼí belief that many of the world's different religions were revealed by God as part of one gradually unfolding plan
  - Progressive revelation (Baháʼí) – the Baháʼí belief that God progressively reveals the truth through successive Manifestations of God
  - Baháʼí Faith and Zoroastrianism
  - Baháʼí Faith and Hinduism
  - Baháʼí Faith and Buddhism
  - Muhammad in the Baháʼí Faith
  - Jesus in the Baháʼí Faith
- Manifestation of God (Baháʼí Faith) – individuals whom Baháʼís believe were sent by God to establish religious teachings appropriate for their time and place, such as the Buddha, Jesus, and Muhammad
- Baháʼí Faith on life after death
- Baháʼí cosmology
- Faith in the Baháʼí Faith
- Baháʼí views on sin
- Martyrdom in the Baháʼí Faith
- Aniconism in the Baháʼí Faith – the Baháʼí prohibition on images of God or those seen as Manifestations of God
- Covenant of Baháʼu'lláh
  - Covenant-breaker
- Baháʼí views on science

=== Baháʼí social principles ===
- Baháʼí Faith and the unity of humanity – the Baháʼí teaching that humanity is fundamentally one and should achieve a state of unity in diversity
  - Baháʼí Faith and Native Americans
  - New world order (Baháʼí)
  - Baháʼí perspective on international human rights
- Baháʼí Faith and gender equality
- Baháʼí Faith and education
- Baháʼí Faith and auxiliary language – the Baháʼí teaching that the world should adopt a worldwide auxiliary language in addition to people's various languages to facilitate the unity of humanity
- Socioeconomic development and the Baháʼí Faith

=== Baháʼí laws ===
Baháʼí laws – practices that are religiously binding for Baháʼís

- Prayer in the Baháʼí Faith – Baháʼí teachings on prayer, including both daily obligatory prayer and devotional prayer (general prayer)
  - Obligatory Baháʼí prayers
- Nineteen Day Feast gathering of a local Baháʼí community that occurs on the first day of each month of the Baháʼí calendar
- Huqúqu'lláh – the Baháʼí obligation to give to the Baháʼí funds, which support the activities of Baháʼí communities
- Nineteen Day Fast – a period of fasting that Baháʼís observe from sunrise to sunset for 19 days once each year
- Baháʼí marriage
- Baháʼí views on homosexuality
- Baháʼí pilgrimage

== History ==
History of the Baháʼí Faith – events from 1863 to the present that had their background in two earlier movements in the nineteenth century, Shaykhism and Bábism

- Shaykhism – a Shi'a Islamic religious movement founded by Shaykh Ahmad (1753–1826)
- Bábism – a religion founded by the Báb in 1844 that Baháʼís see as a predecessor to the Baháʼí Faith; see Outline of Bábism
- Baháʼí–Azali split – the split of the followers of Bábism into Baháʼís, who accepted Baháʼu'lláh as a figure prophesied in the teachings of Bábism, and Azalis, who followed Subh-i-Azal
- Baháʼí prophecies
- Attempted schisms in the Baháʼí Faith
  - Orthodox Baháʼí Faith
  - Leland Jensen
- ʻAbdu'l-Bahá's journeys to the West
- World Unity Conference
- Baháʼí World Congress
- Baháʼí teaching plans
- Baháʼí radio
- Persecution of Baháʼís
  - Seven Martyrs of Tehran
  - 1903 Isfahan anti-Baháʼí riots
  - Statements about the persecution of Baháʼís
  - Baháʼí 7
  - Egyptian identification card controversy
- Baháʼí Faith by country – estimated numbers of Baháʼís globally, by country, and by continent, with links to full articles on the Baháʼí Faith in individual countries and continents
  - Baháʼí Faith in Africa
  - Baháʼí Faith in Asia
  - Baháʼí Faith in Europe
  - Baháʼí Faith in North America
  - Baháʼí Faith in Oceania
  - Baháʼí Faith in South America

== Important figures ==
=== Central figures ===
- The Báb – the founder of the Bábism, seen by Baháʼís as the predecessor to their religion
- Baháʼu'lláh – the founder of the Baháʼí Faith
- ʻAbdu'l-Bahá – the appointed successor of Baháʼu'lláh

=== Other influential figures ===
==== Groups ====
- Afnán – the maternal relatives of the Báb
- Apostles of Baháʼu'lláh – nineteen eminent early followers of Baháʼu'lláh
- Baháʼu'lláh's family
- Hands of the Cause – a select group of Baháʼís, appointed for life, whose main function was to propagate and protect the Baháʼí Faith
- Knights of Baháʼu'lláh – a title given by Shoghi Effendi to Baháʼís who brought the Baháʼí Faith to new countries and territories

==== Notable individuals ====
- Shoghi Effendi – the appointed head of the Baháʼí Faith from 1921 until his death in 1957, entitled the Guardian
- Badíʻ – the 17-year-old who delivered Baháʼu'lláh's tablet to the Shah and was subsequently killed
- Nabíl-i-Aʻzam – the author of the account of early Bábí and Baháʼí history called The Dawn-breakers
- Mishkín-Qalam – a calligrapher who lived during the lifetime of Baháʼu'lláh, and designer of the Greatest Name
- Mírzá Abu'l-Faḍl – a Baháʼí scholar who travelled broadly and authored several books about the Baháʼí Faith
- Martha Root – a prominent travelling teacher of the Baháʼí Faith in the late 19th and early 20th centuries
- Rúhíyyih Khánum – the wife of Shoghi Effendi, who was appointed a Hand of the Cause

== Texts and scriptures ==
- Baháʼí literature

=== By the Báb ===
- Persian Bayán – one of the principal scriptural writings of the Báb, the founder of Bábism, which is also revered in the Baháʼí Faith
- Arabic Bayán – one of the principal scriptural writings of the Báb, the founder of Bábism, which is also revered in the Baháʼí Faith
- Selections from the Writings of the Báb – a book of excerpts from notable works of the Báb, compiled by the Universal House of Justice, the highest authority in the Baháʼí Faith

=== By Baháʼu'lláh ===
List of writings of Baháʼu'lláh

- Epistle to the Son of the Wolf – the last major work of Baháʼu'lláh, written soon before his death in 1892
- Four Valleys – a mystical treatise written in Persian
- Gems of Divine Mysteries – a long epistle in Arabic
- Gleanings from the Writings of Baháʼu'lláh – a compilation of Baháʼu'lláh's writings selected by Shoghi Effendi
- Kitáb-i-Aqdas – a central book of the Baháʼí Faith which lays out the Baháʼí laws
- Kitáb-i-Íqán – the primary theological work of the Baháʼí Faith
- Hidden Words – a collection of short poetic utterances, 71 in Arabic and 82 in Persian
- The Seven Valleys – a mystical treatise written in Persian
- Summons of the Lord of Hosts – a collection of Baháʼu'lláh's writings that were written to the kings and rulers of the world
- Tabernacle of Unity – a collection of several of Baháʼu'lláh's writings first published in July 2006
- Tablets of Baháʼu'lláh Revealed After the Kitáb-i-Aqdas – a collection of Baháʼu'lláh's writings from later in his life that have been published together since 1978

=== By ʻAbdu'l-Bahá ===
- Paris Talks – a book transcribed from talks given by ʻAbdu'l-Bahá while in Paris
- The Secret of Divine Civilization – a book written in 1875 by ʻAbdu'l-Bahá, addressed to the rulers and the people of Persia
- Some Answered Questions – contains questions posed by Laura Clifford Barney (between 1904 and 1906) and ʻAbdu'l-Bahá's answers
- Tablets of the Divine Plan – 14 letters (tablets) written between September 1916 and March 1917 by ʻAbdu'l-Bahá to Baháʼís in the United States and Canada
- Tablet to Dr. Forel – a letter of ʻAbdu'l-Bahá, written in reply to questions asked by Auguste-Henri Forel, a Swiss myrmecologist, neuroanatomist and psychiatrist
- Tablet to The Hague – a letter which ʻAbdu'l-Bahá wrote to the Central Organisation for Durable Peace in The Hague, The Netherlands on 17 December 1919
- Will and Testament of ʻAbdu'l-Bahá – A seminal document, written in three stages by ʻAbdu'l-Bahá

=== By Shoghi Effendi ===
- The Advent of Divine Justice – a letter to the Baháʼís of the United States and Canada, dated December 25, 1938
- God Passes By – an account of the first century of Baháʼí history (beginning with the declaration of the Báb in 1844)
- Promised Day is Come – a book-length letter written for Baháʼís in the Western world, dated 1941

=== By the Universal House of Justice ===
- The Promise of World Peace

== Organizations ==
=== Baháʼí administration ===
Baháʼí administration

- International Baháʼí Council – the precursor to the Universal House of Justice that existed from 1951–1963
- Universal House of Justice – the supreme governing institution of the Baháʼí Faith, first elected in 1963
- Spiritual Assemblies – a term given by ʻAbdu'l-Bahá to refer to elected councils that govern the Baháʼí Faith
- Institution of the Counsellors
  - International Teaching Centre
- Baháʼí International Community

=== Other Baháʼí organizations ===
- Baháʼí Esperanto League
- Baháʼí school
  - Baháʼí Institute for Higher Education
  - Banani International Secondary School
  - Townshend International School
  - School of the Nations (Macau)
  - New Era High School
  - Barli Development Institute for Rural Women
- FUNDAEC
- Ruhi Institute

== Places ==
- Síyáh-Chál
- Garden of Ridván, Baghdad
- Báb's house
- Baháʼí World Centre
  - Baháʼí World Centre buildings
    - Shrine of the Báb
    - Shrine of Baháʼu'lláh
      - Qiblih – the point towards which Baháʼís face during their daily obligatory prayers
    - Shrine of ʻAbdu'l-Bahá
  - Terraces (Baháʼí)
- Baháʼí House of Worship – a place of worship of the Baháʼí Faith, also known as a Baháʼí temple
  - List of Baháʼí Houses of Worship
    - Lotus Temple
    - Baháʼí House of Worship (Wilmette, Illinois)
    - Sydney Baháʼí Temple
    - Santiago Bahá'í Temple
- Haziratu'l-Quds – a Baháʼí administrative centre often used for Baháʼí gatherings, also known as a Baháʼí centre

== Calendar ==
Baháʼí calendar

- List of observances set by the Baháʼí calendar
  - Baháʼí Holy Days
    - Baháʼí Naw-Rúz
    - Ridván
    - Twin Holy Birthdays
      - Birth of Baháʼu'lláh
    - Day of the Covenant (Baháʼí)
  - Ayyám-i-Há

== Other topics ==
- Alláh-u-Abhá
- Baháʼí Faith in fiction
- Baháʼí orthography
- Baháʼí studies
  - Baháʼí review
  - Baháʼí Studies Review
- Baháʼí symbols
- Criticism of the Baháʼí Faith
  - Political objections to the Baháʼí Faith
- World Religion Day
