= Baháʼí Faith in Bolivia =

The Baháʼí Faith in Bolivia begins with references to the country in Baháʼí literature as early as 1916. The first Baháʼí to arrive in Bolivia was in 1940 through the beginning of the arrival of coordinated pioneers, people who chose to move for the growth of the religion, from the United States. That same year the first Bolivian joined the religion. The first Baháʼí Local Spiritual Assembly was elected in La Paz in 1945 and the first native Bolivian formally joined the religion in 1956 which soon began spreading widely amongst indigenous Bolivians. The community elected an independent National Spiritual Assembly in 1961. By 1963 there were hundreds of local assemblies. The Baháʼí Faith is currently the largest international religious minority in Bolivia. The largest population of Baháʼís in South America is in Bolivia, a country whose general population is estimated to be 55%-70% indigenous and 30%-42% Mestizo, with a Baháʼí population estimated at 217,000 in 2005 according to the Association of Religion Data Archives.

== ʻAbdu'l-Bahá's Tablets of the Divine Plan ==
ʻAbdu'l-Bahá, the son of the founder of the religion, wrote a series of letters, or tablets, to the followers of the religion in the United States in 1916–1917; these letters were compiled together in the book titled Tablets of the Divine Plan. The sixth of the tablets was the first to mention Latin American regions and was written on April 8, 1916, but was delayed in being presented in the United States until 1919 — after the end of World War I and the Spanish flu. The sixth tablet was translated and presented by Mirza Ahmad Sohrab on April 4, 1919, and published in Star of the West magazine on December 12, 1919.

"His Holiness Christ says: Travel ye to the East and to the West of the world and summon the people to the Kingdom of God. ... the republic of Mexico...to be familiar with the Spanish language...Guatemala, Honduras, Salvador, Nicaragua, Costa Rica, Panama and the seventh country Belize...Attach great importance to the indigenous population of America...Likewise the islands of ...Cuba, Haiti, Puerto Rico, Jamaica, ... Bahama Islands, even the smallWatling Island...Haiti and Santo Domingo...the islands of Bermuda... the republics of the continent of South America—Colombia, Ecuador, Peru, Brazil, The Guianas, Bolivia, Chile, Argentina, Uruguay, Paraguay, Venezuela; also the islands to the north, east and west of South America, such as Falkland Islands, the Galapagòs, Juan Fernandez, Tobago and Trinidad...."

Following the release of these tablets and then ʻAbdu'l-Bahá's death in 1921, a few Baháʼís began moving to or at least visiting Latin America.

== Early Phase ==
Shoghi Effendi, who was named ʻAbdu'l-Bahá's successor, wrote a cable on May 1, 1936 to the Baháʼí Annual Convention of the United States and Canada, and asked for the systematic implementation of ʻAbdu'l-Bahá's vision to begin. In his cable he wrote:

"Appeal to assembled delegates ponder historic appeal voiced by ʻAbdu'l-Bahá in Tablets of the Divine Plan. Urge earnest deliberation with incoming National Assembly to insure its complete fulfillment. First century of Baháʼí Era drawing to a close. Humanity entering outer fringes most perilous stage its existence. Opportunities of present hour unimaginably precious. Would to God every State within American Republic and every Republic in American continent might ere termination of this glorious century embrace the light of the Faith of Baháʼu'lláh and establish structural basis of His World Order."

Following the May 1st cable, another cable from Shoghi Effendi came on May 19 calling for permanent pioneers to be established in all the countries of Latin America. The Baháʼí National Spiritual Assembly of the United States and Canada appointed an Inter-America Committee to take charge of the preparations. During the 1937 Baháʼí North American Convention, Shoghi Effendi cabled advising the convention to prolong their deliberations to permit the delegates and the National Assembly to consult on a plan that would enable Baháʼís to go to Latin America as well as to include the completion of the outer structure of the Baháʼí House of Worship in Wilmette, Illinois. In 1937 the First Seven Year Plan (1937–44), which was an international plan for the Baháʼís designed by Shoghi Effendi, gave the American Baháʼís the goal of establishing the Baháʼí Faith in every country in Latin America. With the spread of American Baháʼís in Latin American, Baháʼí communities and Local Spiritual Assemblies, the local administrative unit of the religion, began to form in 1938 across Latin America.

A pioneer from Los Angeles, Eleanor Adler, sailed from New Orleans on the S.S. Santa Marta on November 16, 1940 to pioneer to Bolivia by settling in La Paz taking up residence at Pension Cúellar, 899, 6 de Agosta though she did not at first speak Spanish. Citizens of Bolivia joined the religion - the first being Yvonne de Cúellar - though Adler left about May 1941 and de Cúellar was born in France. Regardless, when Adler left there was a group of three Bolivians Baháʼís present in La Paz.

Pioneer Flora Hottes arrived in June 1942. In late 1943 the fifth Bolivian Baháʼí and the first to take the religion beyond La Paz moved to Tarija. Maria Lijeron was a lawyer who also had a radio program. The first Local Spiritual Assembly, the local administrative unit of the religion, in Bolivia was elected in 1945. In 1946 committees with regional responsibilities were assigned - Bolivia and Peru being one such grouping - at the same time Gwenne D. Sholtis arrived as a pioneer and settled in Sucre and three Bolivians there joined the religion the same year.

== Growth ==
The first South American Baháʼí Congress was held in Buenos Aires, Argentina, in November, 1946 and de Cúellar of Bolivia attended.

In 1947 several translations had been done or were in process by de Cúellar and her husband, Col. Arturo Cúella Echazu, including God Passes By, Foundations of World Unity, and a selection from the Gleanings from the Writings of Baháʼu'lláh. At the same time the first assembly of Sucre was elected. By then Sholtis was present in Cochabamba and Baháʼís from Sucre were pioneering to other cities while maintaining assembly status.

The second South American Baháʼí Congress was celebrated in Santiago, Chile, in January, 1948 and de Cúellar was the official delegate. The congress announced the formation of the South American Teaching Committee. Retrospectively, a stated purpose for the committee was to facilitate a shift in the balance of roles from North American guidance and Latin cooperation to Latin guidance and North American cooperation. The process was well underway by 1950 and was to be enforced about 1953. In March 1948, chairman of the South American Teaching Committee, Estéban Canales of Chile, took a trip to speak in various countries. In Bolivia he spoke to an audience of about 80 people and 40 stayed for a reception afterwards. In September the Teaching Committee proposed sending a pioneer from Santiago, Chile, to Sucre: Rosy Vodanovich. At the same time the progress on the translation of God Passes By was submitted to review of the strength of the translation to a literary critic. In December 1949 Mary Binda went as the first pioneer from Bolivia choosing Venezuela as her goal. In December 1949 a regional conference on the promulgation of the religion in Peru and Bolivia was held in La Paz. In September a Study Institute was held.

The Regional Baháʼí Spiritual Assembly of South America was elected in 1950. In the face of the changes of coordination between the American and Latin Baháʼís the Sucre assembly was lost in 1950 and was reformed in 1951. Meanwhile, the spring 1951 celebration of World Religion Day with 60 people participating was held by the Baháʼís of La Paz. In 1952 Arturo, Yvonne and Dorothy Campbell were delegates from the Baháʼís of Bolivia to a regional UN Conference on NGOs. Rezzi Sunshine pioneered to Cochabamba, arriving on January 26, 1955. The fifth convention for the regional national assembly of the Baháʼís of South America was held in La Paz in 1955. A series of study classes preceding the convention was held on the Advent of Divine Justice, the Promised Day is Come, as well as the topics of "Indians of South America", and "Sacrifice". Indeed, Rezzi Sunshine began offering classes on English and the religion in Indian villages near where she lived in Cochabamba while the Baháʼís there elected the first local assembly and a pioneer moved to an Indian village named Chuquisaca.

In 1957 the regional assembly was split into two - basically northern/eastern South America with the Republics of Brazil, Peru, Colombia, Ecuador, and Venezuela, in Lima, Peru and one of the western/southern South America with the Republics of Argentina, Chile, Uruguay, Paraguay, and Bolivia in Buenos Aires, Argentina. Hand of the Cause ʻAlí-Muhammad Varqá oversaw the election of the Assembly in Buenos Aires.

In 1961-2 thousands of Aymara Indians in hundreds of localities formed near 100 assemblies.

=== Indians ===
Across the Americas by 1947 members of the Baháʼí Faith had contacted peoples of Alaska and Greenland, Canada, the United States, Mexico, Guatemala, Argentina, Bolivia and Peru.

The first translations into Aymara and Quechua languages of Baháʼí literature was done by the assembly in La Paz in 1951.

The subject of outreach to Indian populations was among the topics consulted on at the fifth convention for the regional national assembly of the Baháʼís of South America in 1955.

A cornerstone in the process of outreach began on Sept. 8, 1956 when the first Indians of Bolivia formally entered the religion and they promptly engaged other Indians in the religion - the distinctive moment for them being when they were allowed in the front door of the Baháʼí center. They were Andres and Carmelo Jachacollo (all members of their village had the same last name) and through their efforts the first all-Indian assembly of Bolivia was elected in 1957 in the village of Vilacollo, of which Andres was the chairman, speaking the Aymará language though the location was in deep poverty and the people somewhat nomadic.

This led to a general sense of excitement. During the first years of the Ten Year Crusade, 1953–1963, reports of the large conversions to the religion in Africa began to come through, (see Baháʼí Faith in Africa.) Then news began to arrive of the conversion of large numbers in Bolivia, and Shoghi Effendi began to increase his insistence on teaching the indigenous groups. For example, on May 26, 1957, he sent a letter through his secretary to the new national assemblies of Latin America, referring to the "Tablets of the Divine Plan" with respect to the indigenous inhabitants of the Americas.

In December 1957 a special class on the religion was held in Cochabamba, and another in La Paz in March 1958, for Indians peoples from the Huanuni area which included some who wanted to travel to other Indian groups to introduce the religion there. The school held in La Paz included Andres and several of his kin, some Chola peoples (another Aymara people) attended. The first Chola Baháʼí, Juana Topa, joined the religion July 12, 1958, some months after the school. Guests at the school included auxiliary board member Katherine McLaughlin, and Rezzi Sunshine. This group of students of the school brought the religion to Potosí, Huanacota, and Chalapiti villages and several spoke on local radio programs as well.

The second convention for the regional assembly, also held in 1958, devoted a large proportion of the consultation of the convention to the clearly expressed needs of the Bolivian Indian Baháʼís in their deep desire to serve the religion as traveling presenters of the religion to bring it to other Indians. One result was a call for pioneers to serve in the Indian communities.

1959 was a year of several developments pre-staging for a wave of enrollments in the religion. In 1957 the Baháʼís in Vilakollo requested their national assembly that a visit from a Hand of the Cause be made to their village. The assembly arranged for a visit from a more local administrators but on May 10, 1959, Hand of the Cause, Dr. Hermann Grossmann, made the visit to the Indian village. That year a second all-Indian assembly was elected, this time in the village of Jankahuyo, in the Potosí Department through the efforts of Estanislau Alvarez, chairman of the National Indian Teaching Committee, who made the trip to the village to help elect the assembly with Mr. Costas. The Baháʼís of that village decided to send an individual to Santiago Chile to learn more of the religion and return as a teacher to them while others including Andres would live among them for the year. Following this and the assembly election Alverez and Costas returned to the area for a five-month period where along with Andres more than 30 members of the region joined the religion across 7 locations in the Potosí Department. That July the community of Jankohuyo held an all-day memorial for the Báb on the commemoration of his execution. That December 1959 a Baháʼí school for Bolivian Indians was held in La Paz under the sponsorship of the National Indian Teaching Committee, with an attendance of thirty people. Courses on the lives of the central figures of the Báb, Baháʼu'lláh and ʻAbdu'l-Bahá, as well as Shoghi Effendi; on principles and laws of the Faith; and on the ways Baháʼís run their administration including a period of practice-voting for a local spiritual assembly. That following spring in 1960 more than 1000 Indians are believed to have joined the religion from near 100 locations. The first Baháʼí Indian Congress of Bolivia was held in Oruro in February 1961, with 116 Indians participating from forty-six different localities. At this event a further 22 joined the religion. From April 1960 to April 1961 no less than thirteen hundred of Aymara speaking Indians, in over one hundred localities, joined the religion and formed over twenty local assemblies. Following observing the election of the National Assembly of Bolivia, Hand of the Cause Rahmatu'lláh Muhájir began touring the Indian peoples of Bolivia. During his 40-day tour he was approached by hundreds of Baháʼís in village after village. This was followed by trips of national assembly members in July among Indian villages. By April 1962 there was a gain of more than twenty-five hundred additional Indian Baha'is and through their contacts to Ecuador, Peru and Chile where between January and April 1962 nearly two hundred Indians converted to the religion, representing the first conversions on such a scale in those areas, though Hand of the Cause Abu'l-Qásim Faizi was urging a need for instilling a deeper understanding of the religion.

In 1958 there were two all-Indian Local Spiritual Assemblies in South America - Huanuni and Vilcollo - by 1963 there were twenty five such assemblies in Bolivia.

=== Snapshot of the distribution of Baháʼís in 1963 ===
Assemblies (at least 9 adults) /Groups (2 to 8 adults in the community) in early 1963
Potosí Department	Chuquisaca Department	Oruro Department	Cochabamba Department	La Paz Department
Alonso de Ibáñez Province; 14 / 32	Jaime Zudáñez Province; 13 / 6	Ladislao Cabrera Province; 1 / 14	Narciso Campero; 6 / 3	Aroma Province; 0 / 5
Antonio Quijarro Province; 1 / 19	Oropeza Province; 14 / 16	Pantaleón Dalence Province; 5 / 7	Mizque Province; 0 / 11	Omasuyos Province; 2 /
Tomás Frías Province; 3 / 26	Juana Azurduy de Padilla Province; 10 / 9	Eduardo Abaroa Province; 3 / 21	Tapacarí Province; 1 / 2	Ingavi Province; 0 / 7
Bernardino Bilbao Province; 2 / 10	Tomina Province; 2 / 7	Poopó Province; 1 / 14		Inquisivi Province; 2 / 2
Rafael Bustillo Province; 7 / 10	Yamparáez Province; 1 / 2	Cercado Province (Oruro); 1 / 1	Arque province 0 / 5	Eliodoro Camacho Province; 0 / 11
Charcas Province; 4 / 16		Saucarí Province; 0 / 1		Loayza Province; 0 / 1
Chayanta Province; 1 / 6				Capinota Province; 0 / 3
José María Linares Province; 1 / 0				

=== National Community ===
In 1961 each country of the regional assembly of southern South America elected its own National Spiritual Assembly. The election of the Bolivian national assembly - representative of a community the majority of whom were of the Aymara people - were (in alphabetical order by last name): Estanislao Alverez, recording secretary, Athas Costas, Sabino Ortega (first Indian teacher), Andres Jachakovo (first Indian believer in Bolivia), vice-chairman, Yolanda de Lopez, secretary, Daniel Mauricio (founder of first Baha'i school), Massoud Khamsi, chairman, Alberto Saldias, treasurer, and Alberto Rocabado. The election was witnessed by Hand of the Cause Rahmatu'lláh Muhájir.

In 1961 eight of the members of the Local Spiritual Assembly of La Paz were: Hernan Saravia, Jane Khamsi, Isaac Mamani, Lecile Webster, E. Alverez, Livia Barbaro, Morty Landivar, and Massoud Khamsi. and it performed the first Baháʼí marriage of Bolivia that year. In October the first national Baháʼí school was held on its new permanent location and the students spent the majority of the time clearing the land, planting crops and preparing it for permanent buildings in the village of Meguilla. By summer 1962 there were nearly 4,000 Baha'is in 321 localities, with sixty-two local assemblies and Hand of the Cause Abu'l-Qásim Faizi was touring Bolivia where he inaugurated a school for teachers of the religion and attended a national congress. The school was established and opened with Athos Costa as its director. Courses were given in geography, history, hygiene, health, writing as well as Baha'i subjects like progressive revelation, its history, teachings, and administration across three 8-hour days with a final test and students left with their own notepad.

In April 1963 the members of the national assemblies of the world were the delegates to elect the first Universal House of Justice to be head of the religion after the death of Shoghi Effendi. The Bolivian members of the national assembly that year were: Estanislao Alvarez, Athos Costas, Mrs. Costas, Massoud Khamsi, Yolanda de Lopes, Sabino Ortega, Alberto Saldias Reyes, Alberto Rocabado, and Andres Jachakollo Ticona. In addition, the national newspaper El Diario of La Paz devoted an entire page to "Centenary of the Baha'i World Faith," with text covering the history, principles, objectives and a list of Bolivians leaving for the first Baháʼí World Congress. There were illustrations of four Baháʼí Houses of Worship and the International Archives building at the Baháʼí World Centre. During that congress a similar one was held in Bolivia in Oruro to commemorate the centenary of the events of the Ridván garden.

== Nine Year Plan and the growth of Bolivian Baháʼís ==
During the 1964 national convention to elect the national assembly only twenty-seven of the thirty-eight delegates arrived due to the political troubles and violence in Bolivia. Regardless, Hand of the Cause Jalál Kházeh presented the Nine Year Plan from the Universal House of Justice which would then cover 1964 to 1973. The goals included setting up 1200 centers and 600 assemblies, recognition of the Holy Days is to be obtained, literature was to be translated and published in the Chiriguano, Siriano, Yanoiguia, Moxos, Tokano and Chipaya languages, literature in Quechua was to be enriched and Baha'i education was to be extended to as many youth and children as possible. It was noted that the rate of people joining the religion had substantially slowed that prior year. The religion had been recognized in 1963 by the government but the national assembly was legally registered in 1966.

The now annual national congress of Baha'is in Oruro attracted some seventy-four people for which there was newspaper and radio coverage. Hooper Dunbar, then an Auxiliary Board member and later member of the Universal House of Justice, toured Bolivia in 1964 with local Baháʼís and Athos Costos, member of the National Spiritual Assembly.

The first Afro Bolivians joined the religion in 1964. The National Convention of the Baha'is of Bolivia in 1965 was attended by delegates and friends who came from eight of the nine provinces ("Departments") of Bolivia. Hand of the Cause Dr. Muhájir and now Auxiliary Board member Athas Costas attended.

In 1966 the national assembly designated five Regional Institutes located in different areas of the country which would have its own director and teacher, both living permanently in the area and dedicating all their time to promulgating the religion. The students were envisioned as teachers of teachers - to be taught to help local assemblies in augmenting Baha'i life, to read and write, and establish primary school classes for the children and young people of the nearby villages. The Baha'i National School in Cochabama held a three-month course starting August 1 covering the election and function of the assembly; Baha'i teachings; and the Spanish alphabet. The National Spiritual Assembly of Bolivia met on September 3 with then president of Bolivia, General Rene Barrientos Ortuno who congratulated the Baháʼís on their devotion to education. In the winter 1966-67 the Ministry of Indian Affairs in Bolivia issued an official circular letter stating that as the activities of the religion have "no relationship whatsoever with politics", that Baha'is should be accorded freedom of expression, freedom in movement and freedom in worship. However general unrest in the country prevented many assemblies from forming, though the first Local Spiritual Assembly in Beni, on the Brazilian border, and Tarija, on the Argentine frontier, did form. In the summer of 1967, Athas Costas, Auxiliary Board member, and Dr. Ouladi, National Spiritual Assembly representative, went on a trip in a Baha'i-owned jeep to meet with local officials in troubled areas in several Departments to specify the non-political nature of the religion and federal endorsement of its freedom to practice the religion. Copies of the federal registration of the religion as a religion recognized by the government by the Ministry of Justice and Immigration from 1963 were distributed to local assemblies in 1968.

Cochabamba was a center of a double event in the summer of 1967. First, a ten-day training course was held in June at the national Baháʼí school for the purpose of training young rural teachers in techniques to be used in the thirty proposed literacy centers to be established in Bolivia. Second, some several thousand visitors came to the first exhibition on the religion in Bolivia across a five-day period. The national assembly planned to take the exhibition on a tour of Bolivia. Radio and newspaper coverage also occurred.

For twenty-eight days in November 1967 Hand of the Cause Rúhíyyih Khanum toured Bolivia. She spoke to a special group of young instructors while they were engaged in study courses in Cochabamba. She attended the Nineteen Day Feast in Cochabamba, showing slides of her travels. She gave public talks in La Paz and Cochabamba, and two unscheduled talks to the Associacion Feminina Christiana as well as some villages where she was welcomed to stay.

In August 1968 the first meeting to the newly defined Continental Board of Counsellors for South America met in Cochabamba, Bolivia, with Hand of the Cause Jaláh Khazéh and Hooper Dunbar among the attendees.

In 1969 there were about 208 local assemblies with 20 full-time Bolivian instructors and 70 to 100 who gave shorter periods of service to teaching. The plan was for each teacher, accompanied by a pioneer, to visit 20 communities each month and to find others who could be trained in practical steps of administration. A particular problem was that the population in the Altiplano was largely nomadic, moving to gather and sell the annual harvest. Many of them are away during the elections Baháʼís hold in April.

In September 1969 the first study course in the history of Bolivia for campesino Indian women was held under the auspices at the Local Spiritual Assembly of La Paz and the Regional Teaching Committee of Departmento La Paz.

The Cúellars moved to the United States in 1969 to live near their daughter. For her service to the religion Sra. Cúellar was titled the "Spiritual Mother of Bolivia". Also that year Andres Jachakovo was appointed as an Auxiliary Board member.

Twenty four youth converted to the religion together in Santa Cruz de la Sierra, a location that had had little conversion activity, in March 1970. In June Hand of the Cause Enoch Olinga spent two weeks touring Bolivia. He gave well-attended conferences in the Club Aleman in La Paz and in the Universidad Técnica de Oruro as well as visiting among villages in the Departments of La Paz, Cochabamba, Drura, Potosí, and Chuquisaca.

In August Hand of the Cause Rúhíyyih Khanum returned to Bolivia representing the Universal House of Justice at a continental conference held in Bolivia. Some 600 Baháʼís attended including six Continental Counselors, a dozen auxiliary board members, and 39 members of national assemblies from 19 countries. It was announced that 30,000 people had joined the religion from April 1969 to the time of the conference from across South America. Coverage in newspapers, radio, and television accompanied the conference was capped by the surprise reception of the President of Bolivia for some 350 Baháʼís the day after the conference where he mentioned he had visited Haifa and knew of the Baháʼí Holy Places. By 1971 the aftereffects of the conference showed an increase in conversions to the religion including the first Baha'is in the last Department of the country previously with no Baháʼís and the conversion of a Christian minister who led hundreds more to the religion – all together some 9000 conversions by May 1971 with the largest concentration in the area of Santa Cruz. That was raised to 11,000 by July. The revised civil government of 1971 remained supportive of the Baháʼís with permission for a youth conference. Facing various difficulties, pioneers who had settled in Beni strove to both serve the sense of justice of the poor and against lawlessness in the distant countryside.

== The engagement of the national community ==
In 1975–6 Rúhíyyih Khanum travelled by boat through the tributaries of the Amazon River of Brazil unto and into the high mountain ranges of Peru and Bolivia. Thirty six tribal groups were visited over a period of six months; the trip was called The Green Light Expedition, which followed her The Great African Safari. There have also been projects developed from the original expedition - In the Footsteps of the Green Light Expedition and Tear of the Clouds.

In 1982 some 1,300 Baha'is from 42 countries gathered August in Ecuador, the second of five such gatherings. 13 Continental Counsellors, representatives of 24 of the 29 National Spiritual Assemblies in Latin America and the Caribbean, and members of 21 Indian tribes from Bolivia, Brazil, Canada, Chile, Colombia, Ecuador, Panama, Peru, United States and Venezuela attended. The Conferences were dedicated to the memory of Bahíyyih Khánum, Baháʼu'lláh's daughter, on the occasion of the 50th anniversary of her death. Adherents of the religion in Bolivia had again suffered opposition in various locations, both political and religious, so plans were set for appeals to be repeated as before, this time to the civil courts circa 1983–4.

== Socio/economic development ==
After the period of large scale enrollments especially in the 1960s the pace of conversion slowed. However focus on service through socio-economic development began to work in a context of sustainable growth of the religion. Since its inception the religion has had involvement in socio-economic development beginning by giving greater freedom to women, promulgating the promotion of female education as a priority concern, often in some practical expression such as by creating schools, agricultural coops, and clinics. In Bolivia that priority for education led to extending the previous work on tutorial school programs in 1983 with a coordinated engagement across the indigenous peoples from North and South America, a Baha'i radio project, a Baha'i university and other projects. Following these projects conversion to the religion moderated but was more sustained.

=== Regional system of training institutes ===
Through the initiative of the national assembly a 'Yachay Wasi' Baháʼí Tutorial Center was established in Chuquisaca, the heart of the indigenous area of Bolivia and central to the area of the Baha'i population. Its main purpose was to train the teachers for one hundred tutorial schools to be established in the country, many of them in the Departments of Chuquisaca and Cochabamba. In 1984 the Wasi school gained a permanent facility which was extended in 1985 when the first Ruhi Institute programs coordinated youth to assist these tutorial schools in the country. This ongoing effort in regional training schools was lauded by then Vice President Julio Garrett Ayllón when he received a copy of The Promise of World Peace, a statement by the Universal House of Justice to which Ayllón responded that he agreed that "world peace is not only possible but inevitable".

=== Trail of Light ===
The idea for a Trail of Light, aka "Camino del Sol", occurred during preparations for the first Baháʼí Native Council in 1978 in North America. It was eventually defined as a process whereby native Baháʼís engaged with diverse native peoples about a number of issues including promulgating their religion as well as organizing councils for the people and encouraged discovery of mutual cultural links across the native peoples. With increasing prominence of the effort a few years later a three-day training and deepening program developed plans and teams of Baháʼís to travel to different regions to promulgate the religion among the Native Americans. These teams of indigenous Baháʼís from Alaska, Canada and the 48 contiguous United States represented 10 tribes under the name Trail of Light. Teams formed and moved among the indigenous peoples from North America into South America. The Trail of Light team then continued through Bolivia, Chile, Peru and finally Ecuador. Members of the team included three Bolivians - Sabino Ortega and Clemente Pimantel as Quechua speaking Indians, and Andres Jachakollo, an Aymara speaker. At one of the early meetings Ortega took a moment to teach the members a dance he knew while they were in South Dakota and during the lesson people came from outside the building to say that three eagles were circling the building which was felt as a moving religious sign to the people there.

In July 1983 in La Paz the President of Bolivia welcomed the Trail of Light members in Bolivia. Also present were twelve Ministers of Departments from around the country, some of whom were themselves indigenous. The Governor of the Department of La Paz also greeted the Trail members in his office, stating that he identified with many of the Baha'i principles. Other major events of the team in the capital included two twenty-minute cultural programs for the state-owned television network which were later aired nationwide.

The project revisited Bolivia and Peru in 1988. The team of travelers visited individual Baháʼís, Baháʼí schools, made public presentations, and there was newspaper and television news coverage of the visit. The travelers included Lakotas Jacqueline Left Hand Bull, then a Continental Counsellor, and US National Assembly members Patricia Locke and Kevin Locke, along with Bolivians Eloy Anello, Athos Costas, Julian Ugarte and Sabino Ortega. Some of the activities undertaken were the pow wow "grand entrance" dance, songs and dances honoring the Creator, an Indian sign language and jingle dress performance, talks honoring the Incan Empire, other dances honoring women and various legends of the peoples and the hoop dance and the work of the Trail of Light was trying to promulgate.

=== Baháʼí radio ===
Baháʼí radio developed in the late 1960s in Ecuador and was a precursor to the developments in Bolivia in the 1980s, all with the regular feedback from experienced institutions operating out of the Baháʼí World Centre with Dr. David Ruhe, then a member of the Universal House of Justice. The development included an emphasis in raising the resources and people to support a radio station in the local area of the station. The development of programming in Quechua, Aymara and Spanish languages to be used by the station was developed through a country-wide production and broadcasting program in 1983 as prelude to opening of the station.

In January 1983 a presidential decree allocated a medium-wave radio frequency band to the National Spiritual Assembly of Bolivia for Caracollo, near Oruro, to become 'Radio Baha'i of Bolivia'. Construction of the new AM 1 kW. station and its associated teaching institute were scheduled for completion in January 1984 and for inauguration at Naw-Ruz, the Baháʼí new year, the same year WLGI came online in the US. The radio station covered a region in Bolivia and Peru of over 400 assemblies. Its call letters are CP-220. The station used alternative energy systems as well as an appropriate technology setup which allowed its relative low power output to rival the effectiveness of stations with more raw broadcasting power. Its call letters are CP220 and it is still on the air.

=== Nur University ===
In 1983 Baháʼís of Bolivia were planning to establishing a university at Santa Cruz with educational extension programs for rural areas. The project gathered effort as institutions were developed to aide indigenous populations. Two institutions - the FUNIDEAQ, the Foundation for the Development and Education of Aymara and Quechua Peoples, and FUNDESIB, the Foundation for the Integral Development of Bolivia, were established by the National Assembly of Bolivia and hoped that they would serve as an alternative to politically based indigenous or government programs which were seen as promoting hatred or violence by the Baháʼís, See FUNDAEC, for a similar organization in Colombia, where some guidance was borrowed from. One of their early focuses was the development of Nur University which was established as a Baháʼí school of secondary education in August 1984 and started its first academic year in April 1985. Nur University received Presidential Decree No. 20441 authorizing its establishment as a private university and began offering undergraduate programs in 1985 and became Bolivia's first graduate college in 1994. Beginning in 2000 the university received awards and grants and in 2001 Nur was evaluated as a "full university". In 2002 it was selected as a "Center for Educational Excellence" for the Andean region: an initiative launched at the Summit for the Americas, supported by the United States Agency for International Development (USAID).

=== Other ===
A generation after Baháʼí activity in the Chaco Province had ebbed it was re-established via FUNDESIB, who encountered Baháʼís who remembered activity from before and welcomed the new focus during a period of increasing economy distress. FUNDESIB also held the first Baháʼí oriented development conference in Bolivia in November 1987 which included representatives from most of the above initiatives. Baha'is also joined the Bolivian application of the International Year of Peace for 1986. Baháʼís who had graduated from early schools of the religion sometimes became teachers in the successive wave of school developments. A national conference on women was held March 1989 and in various places conversion rates to the religion had again entered the rate of thousands per year.

== Recent situation ==
In 1991 Baháʼís continued socio/economic development programs with the establishment of a reforestation project which reached a size and set of results by 1995 that neighboring communities consulted on how to use the project in their own areas. Graduates of Nur University had gained opportunities to serve in a number of circumstances both in the cities and countryside. Perhaps the most prominent of Nur's graduates was the 2001 mayor of Santa Cruz, while the university continued to grow programs for outreach. Of its students, 51% have been women and 49% men. Approximately 40% of the students received financial assistance from the University through scholarships, discounts based on economic need or work-study positions. The University employs 180 full and part-time faculty and administrative staff and has an annual operating budget of approximately US$3 million, and in 2001 was the second largest private institution of higher learning in Bolivia.

In 2002, Baha'is in an isolated village help to establish a local school system. The religion had been present since the 1980s and youth had refused to participate in ceremonies in the schools using alcohol. The emboldened youth then challenged their elders on the rate of alcoholic consumption in the community and asked that the money could be pooled for a school. The effort was later expanded when the assembly partnered with other civic organizations.

A national youth conference for Bolivian Baháʼís was held for over a hundred people in 2006. Translations of Baháʼí literature into a number of dialects of the indigenous in Bolivia have been done before 2007. The government of Bolivia has taken note of the persecution of Baháʼís in Iran in 2008.

=== Demographics ===
The Baháʼí Faith is currently the largest international religious minority in Bolivia. The population is the largest population of Baháʼís in South America. The country's general population is estimated to be 55%-70% indigenous and 30%-42% Mestizo, with a Baháʼí population estimated at 217,000 in 2005 according to the Association of Religion Data Archives.

== See also ==
- Baháʼí Faith by country
- History of Bolivia
- Religion in Bolivia
- Baháʼí Faith and Native Americans
