= Obligatory Baháʼí prayers =

One of three kinds of daily obligatory prayer in the Baháʼí faith

Obligatory Baháʼí prayers are prayers which are to be said daily by Baháʼís according to a fixed form decreed by Baháʼu'lláh. Prayers in the Baháʼí Faith are reverent words which are addressed to God, and refers to two distinct concepts: obligatory prayer and devotional prayer (general prayer). The act of prayer is one of the most important Baháʼí laws for individual discipline. Along with fasting, obligatory prayer is one of the greatest obligations of a Baháʼí, and the purpose of the obligatory prayer is to foster the development of humility and devotion. The obligation of daily obligatory prayer was prescribed by Baháʼu'lláh, the founder of the Baháʼí Faith, in his book of laws, the Kitáb-i-Aqdas.

It is forbidden to perform the obligatory prayers in congregation, so the daily obligatory prayers are offered individually, though it is not required that they be said in private.

== History ==
In the Bayán the Báb prescribed an obligatory prayer of the nineteen rak'ah (prostrations). He never wrote the text of this prayer, making the implementation of this law dependent on the coming of the Promised One. The Báb explained that the prayer symbolizes a spiritual journey from the realm of the body to the realm of the heart, which can be described as an arc of ascent, mirroring the arc of descent from God to creation.

In the Kitáb-i-Aqdas, Baháʼu'lláh confirmed the law of daily obligatory prayer and wrote that the specific obligatory prayer was recorded in a separate tablet or writing. Baháʼu'lláh wrote the text mentioned, but never released it in order to avoid provoking conflict with Muslims. Instead, sometime before the writing of the supplement to the Kitáb-i-Aqdas, the Questions and Answers, Baháʼu'lláh wrote a set of three obligatory prayers which are the ones used by Baháʼís today. The original obligatory prayer involved nine rak'ah and was to be said in the morning, noon and in the afternoon, probably three cycles at a time. After Baháʼu'lláh's death a strongbox holding the text of the original obligatory prayer was stolen by Mírzá Muhammad ʻAlí.

== Significance ==
The obligatory prayer is a primary religious obligation starting at the age of fifteen and it is the most important kind of prayer. The purpose of the obligatory prayer is to foster the development of humility and devotion. The Baháʼí writings strongly warn against neglecting the prayers or minimizing their importance. The obligatory prayers are a personal spiritual obligation, and failure to observe the law is seen to have only a spiritual penalty.

== Current prayers ==
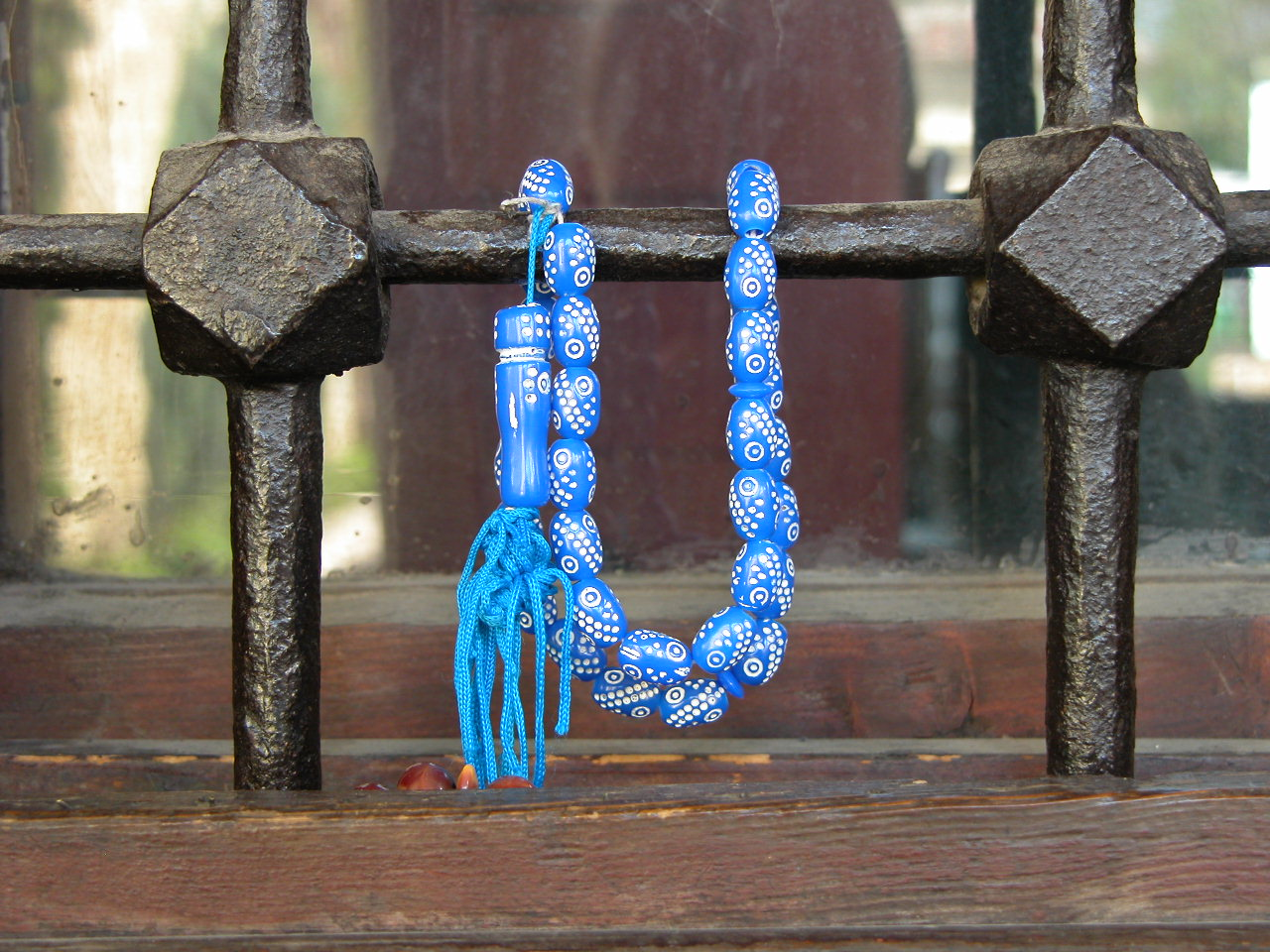
Baháʼís may use prayer beads which consist of either 95 or 19 beads to recite daily prayers if they wish to repeat them, as well as other observances which are to be said a set number of times.

Unlike general prayers in the Baháʼí Faith, there are specific regulations concerning the obligatory prayers; however, obligatory prayer is a personal spiritual obligation and thus no Baháʼí administrative sanction can be obtained if a Baháʼí fails to say their prayer daily.

Baháʼu'lláh wrote three obligatory prayers — the short, the medium and the long — and Baháʼís are free to choose to say one of the three each day. The short and the medium prayer have to be said at specific times; the short has to be said once between noon and sunset and the medium has to be said three times daily: once between dawn and noon, once between noon and sunset and once between sunset and two hours after sunset. The long prayer can be said at any time in the day. The medium and long prayers also include movements and gestures during the prayers, which are themselves obligatory except when a person is physically incapable of performing them. Shoghi Effendi has written that the motions and gestures are symbolic and are used to help maintain concentration during the prayers. Furthermore, the obligatory prayer is to be preceded by ablutions, the cleaning of the hands and face, and one has to face the Qiblih, which is the Shrine of Baháʼu'lláh.

=== Short prayer ===
The short prayer is a brief affirmation of the power of God and the servitude of the worshipper. The prayer should be said while standing in an attitude of humility before God, and it should be said between noon and sunset. The text of the prayer is:

"I bear witness, O my God, that Thou hast created me to know Thee and to worship Thee. I testify, at this moment, to my powerlessness and to Thy might, to my poverty and to Thy wealth. There is none other God but Thee, the Help in Peril, the Self-Subsisting."

=== Medium prayer ===
The medium obligatory prayer must be said three times during the day: once between sunrise and noon, once between noon and sunset, and once after sunset till two hours after sunset. It includes a series of positions and movements from one position to the next, along with specific supplications. The prayer stresses the power and loftiness of God, and the grace that is shown through his revelation. The text of the medium obligatory prayer can be found in Baháʼu'lláh's Prayers and Meditations.

=== Long prayer ===
The long obligatory prayer can be said anytime during the day. It includes a series of positions and movements from one position to the next, along with specific supplications. The prayer also includes parts where the supplicant says the Greatest Name of God in the form of "Allah-u-Abha" at several points. About this prayer, Baháʼu'lláh has stated:

"...the long Obligatory Prayer should be said at those times when one feeleth himself in a prayerful mood. In truth, it hath been revealed in such wise that if it be recited to a rock, that rock would stir and speak forth; and if it be recited to a mountain, that mountain would move and flow. Well is it with the one who reciteth it and fulfilleth God's precepts. Whichever prayer is read will suffice."[8] The text of the long obligatory prayer can be found in Baháʼu'lláh's Prayers and Meditations.[9] This prayer is known in Arabic as salat and as namaz in Persian, and is similar to the Islamic salat.

=== Respecting Rak'ah ===
The nine-rak‘ah obligatory prayer was an original form of obligatory prayer prescribed by Bahá’u’lláh in the Kitáb-i-Aqdas, the central book of laws of the Bahá’í Faith. According to the book’s accompanying notes, the prayer was intended to be performed in the morning, at noon, and in the evening. Its precise text and ritual instructions are unknown because the prayer was lost. The official commentary which states that it was superseded by three later obligatory prayers, from which Bahá’ís are instructed to choose one, is instructed in event one lacks means to fulfill the original binding command, as with the short obligatory prayer.

To date, the Kitáb-i-Aqdas prescribes obligatory prayer and refers to a prayer consisting of nine rak‘ah, defined in the official commentary as the number of recitations of revealed verses accompanied by prescribed genuflections and other movements for prayer.

In Questions and Answers 63, Bahá’u’lláh addresses the apparent discrepancy between the nine-rak‘ah prayer described in the Kitáb-i-Aqdas and the later Tablet of Obligatory Prayers. The answer states that the prayer revealed in the Kitáb-i-Aqdas concerns “a different Obligatory Prayer” and explains that the original prayer and other ordinances had been recorded separately and sent away for preservation and protection. The answer concludes that the three later obligatory prayers were revealed subsequently.

The official commentary explains that the original prayer’s precise nature and specific instructions are unknown because the prayer has been lost. It further states that the prayer’s text, along with a number of other Tablets, was stolen shortly after Bahá’u’lláh’s death.

The current Bahá’í system of obligatory prayer comprises three alternative prayers: the short, medium, and long obligatory prayers. Questions and Answers 65 states: “It is enjoined to offer one of these three prayers; whichever is performed sufficeth.”

The medium obligatory prayer is to be recited daily in the morning, at noon, and in the evening, in three rak'ah per session. The short obligatory prayer is recited once every twenty-four hours at noon, while the long obligatory prayer is recited once every twenty-four hours for a sum total of nine rak'ah daily. The official Bahá’í compilation Prayer and Devotional Life reproduces guidance on these requirements from letters written on behalf of Shoghi Effendi.

The Synopsis and Codification of the Laws and Ordinances of the Kitáb-i-Aqdas summarizes the governing rules for obligatory prayer, including the choice among the three prayers and the periods in which they may be recited.

=== Interpretation of the relationship between the prayers ===
The text of Questions and Answers 63 explicitly distinguishes the nine-rak‘ah prayer mentioned in the Kitáb-i-Aqdas from the three prayers subsequently revealed. The official commentary identifies the original prayer as superseded by the later prayers.

The relationship between the original prescription and the later system through the recurring morning, noon, and evening schedule of the medium obligatory prayer remains valid, treating the persistence of this schedule as evidence of structural continuity between the two forms of prayer for scriptural consistency. This interpretation distinguishes continuity in ritual structure from the separate legal question of whether the original nine-rak‘ah prescription remains binding.

The existence of a shared schedule is established by the texts. The conclusion that the original nine-rak‘ah obligation remains legally binding; the primary texts cited here establish the relevant wording and chronology such that, by themselves, establish the precedent.

=== Comparative religious context ===
The official commentary on the Kitáb-i-Aqdas compares Bahá’í obligatory prayer with the practices of Islam and the Bábí religion. It states that the Báb prescribed an obligatory prayer consisting of nineteen rak‘ahs to be performed once in a twenty-four-hour period. It also notes that Muslim obligatory prayer is performed five times daily, comprising seventeen rak‘ahs in total over the course of a day.

These comparisons place the nine-rak‘ah prescription within a wider history of obligatory prayer across the Islamic, Bábí, and Bahá’í dispensations, providing comparative context for the study of ritual form and religious law, while the legal status of the original Bahá’í prayer is addressed directly by Questions and Answers 63 and the official commentary.

Omid Ghaemmaghami’s conference paper, “From Nine Rakʿahs to Three Prayers: The Historical Development of Obligatory Prayer in the Bahá’í Faith,” examines the development of Bahá’í obligatory prayer through textual evidence from the Kitáb-i-Aqdas and Bahá’u’lláh’s correspondence. The paper describes a sequence comprising the original nine-rak‘ah prayer, a second prayer that was composed but never disseminated, and the three alternative prayers that constitute the current canonical form.

== Laws ==
There are a number of laws and practices associated with the obligatory prayers concerning how to say the obligatory prayer, when Baháʼís are exempt from saying the obligatory prayers, and what to do if one misses saying an obligatory prayer.

=== Practices ===
There are certain practices that must be associated with the saying of the obligatory prayers. They include performing ablution, which consist of washing the hands and face, before the obligatory prayer. In the case that water is unavailable, or its use harmful to the face or hands, the verse "In the Name of God, the Most Pure, the Most Pure" should be repeated five times. The prayer should be said while the reader is facing the Qiblih which is the Shrine of Baháʼu'lláh. It is also preferable for the reader to be standing while saying the obligatory prayers in an attitude of humble reverence. Baháʼí's are also obliged to repeat the Greatest Name (Alláh-u-Abhá) 95 times a day while sitting. Ablutions are also prescribed for this, but it is not necessary to do them again if the repetitions are done right after the daily obligatory prayer.

=== Exemptions ===
Exemptions from saying the obligatory prayer include:

- Children under the age of 15.
- Those that are of ill-health.
- Those that are older than 70.
- Women who are menstruating are exempt from saying their obligatory prayer. They should instead perform their ablutions and repeat the verse "Glorified be God, the Lord of Splendour and Beauty" ninety-five times.

=== Missed prayers ===
In the case of a missed prayer due to insecurity such as during travel, each missed prayer can be compensated for by the repetition of certain verses and movements. The person should perform a single prostration (laying the forehead on any clean surface) in the place of each unsaid obligatory prayer and the prostrations should be performed while saying the verse "Glorified be God, the Lord of Might and Majesty, of Grace and Bounty." The prostrations should then be followed by saying the verse "Glorified be God, the Lord of the kingdoms of earth and heaven" eighteen times while the person is sitting cross-legged.

== Obligatory prayer for the departed ==
Baháʼu'lláh wrote also a specific prayer for the dead, known as the Obligatory prayer for the departed, which is an unrelated practice, despite the similarity in terminology. This prayer is to be said before the interment of a Baháʼí who has reached the age of fifteen. It is a congregational prayer: the words are read aloud by a single person while others who are present stand in silence.
