= Hujjat (Bábí) =

Historical religious leader

Mullā Muḥammad-ʿAlī al-Zanjānī (Arabic: ملا محمد علي الزنجاني), surnamed Ḥujjat (1812 - 1851), was an early leader of the Bábí movement of 19th-century Persia. He is regarded by Baháʼís as part of their own religious history, and is highly featured in the two primary Baháʼí historical books of God Passes By and The Dawn-breakers.

== Background ==
Mullá Muḥammad-ʻAliy-i-Zanjání was the son of Ákhúnd Mullá ʻAbdu'r-Raḥím, a respected early nineteenth century mulla from Zanjan. As a boy, Muḥammad-ʻAlí showed promise, such that his father sent him to the shiite shrine-cities of Najaf and Karbala in Iraq, where he studied under the prominent Sharífu'l-'Ulamá Mázandarání. With the death of his teacher and the closing of the seminaries during the epidemic of 1831, he returned to Iran, settling in Hamadan. When his father died, a delegation came from Zanjan and asked him to assume his father's position. He returned to Zanjan and took up the position, teaching in his father's mosque.

After his return to Zanjan, Mullá Muḥammad-ʻAlí was given the title Ḥujjatu'l-Islám (lit. 'Proof of Islam'), which was a common title for distinguished 'ulamá' at the time, and was known as Ḥujjat-i-Zanjání. An eloquent and fiery speaker, he quickly acquired a large following, which excited rivalry with the other 'ulamá' of the city. The main contention, however, was with his religious views as he was, like his father, an Akhbarí. The Akhbarís, who had a greater reliance on the traditions of the Imams, were opposed by the Usúlís, who relied on rationalism and ijtihád (Islamic rulings based on the judgement of the clerics). Ḥujjat denied the authority of the mujtahids (Usúlí clerics who could issue rulings based on ijtihád), denounced his fellow 'ulamá', issued legal rulings sharply at variance with their own and imposed supererogatory observances on his followers. One example of his variance in rulings concerns the concept of ritual purity. He held that one was not impurified by contact with Christians and Jews during the rain, whereas Usúlís held that non-Muslims were inherently impure and could contaminate believers through contact. He has also been described as having shown a “special regard for the poor” and as having spoken out against the unjust system of ecclesiastical hierarchy of the time. He also held that the Imams and Prophets had physical bodies which were not in any way miraculous.

== Conversion ==
When Ḥujjat first heard of the Bábí movement, he dispatched a messenger named Mullá Iskandar to investigate. The messenger returned bearing a letter from the Báb. Ḥujjat was preparing to deliver a lesson in the mosque after congregational prayers. When Ḥujjat perused the letter, he became visibly agitated, took off his turban (the symbol of his religious authority) and put on a lambskin hat (the symbol of the laity). He is reported to have told some of his followers openly: "The author of these verses claims to be the Bab, as <in the tradition> 'I am the City of Knowledge, and ʻAli is its Gate.'"

== See also ==
- Hujja
- Hujjah
