= Names of God =

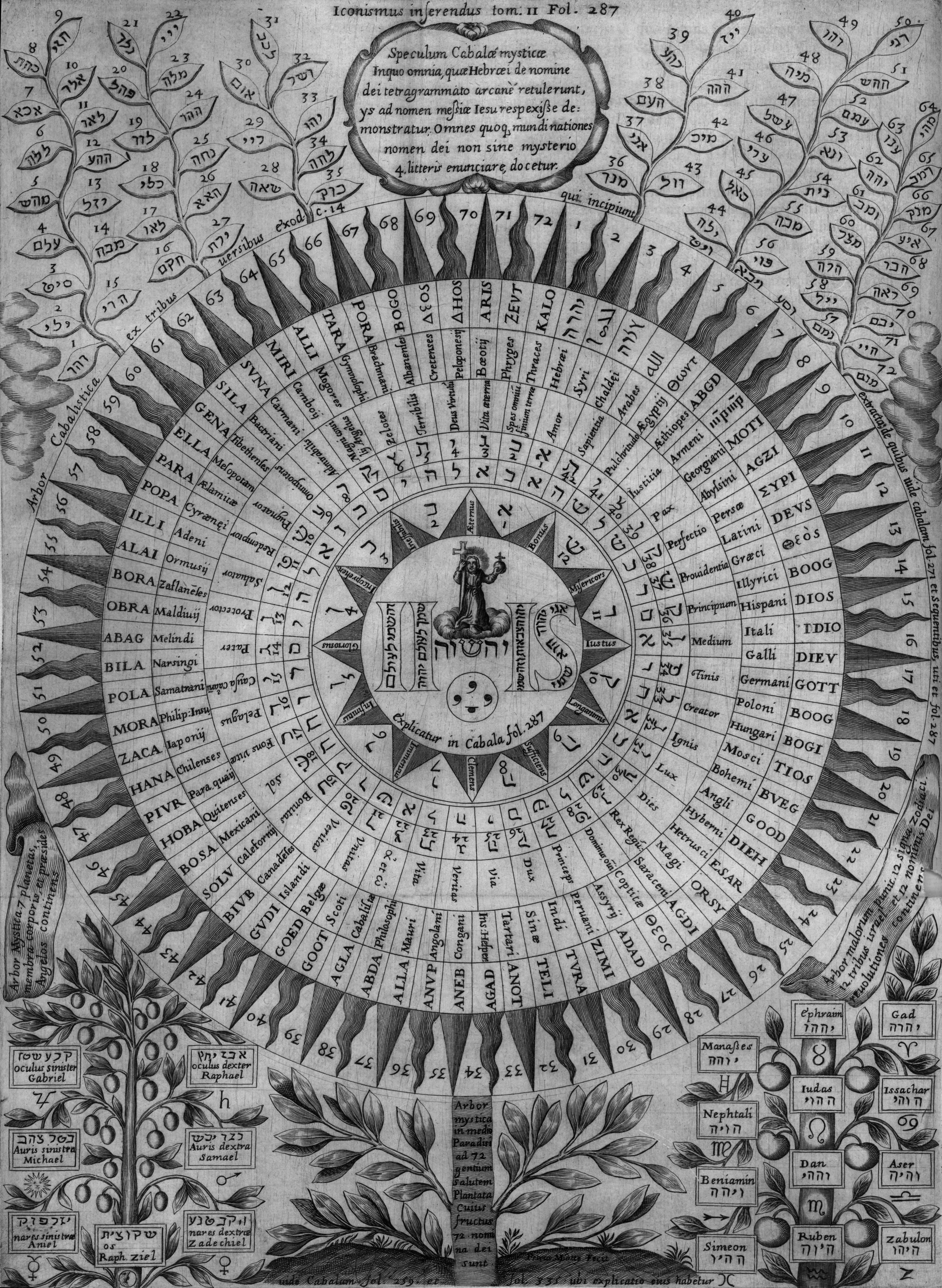
A diagram of the names of God in Athanasius Kircher's Oedipus Aegyptiacus (1652–1654). The style and form are typical of the mystical tradition, as early theologians began to fuse emerging pre-Enlightenment concepts of classification and organization with religion and alchemy, to shape an artful and perhaps more conceptual view of God.

There are various names of God and many titles that refer to God, many of which enumerate the various qualities of a Supreme Being. The English word god (and its equivalent in other languages) is used by multiple religions as a noun to refer to different deities, or specifically to the Supreme Being, as denoted in English by the capitalized and uncapitalized terms God and god. Ancient cognate equivalents for the biblical Hebrew Elohim, one of the most common names of God in the Bible, include proto-Semitic El, biblical Aramaic Elah, and Arabic ilah. The personal or proper name for God in many of these languages may either be distinguished from such attributes, or homonymic. For example, in Judaism the tetragrammaton is sometimes related to the ancient Hebrew ehyeh ("I will be"). It is connected to the passage in Exodus 3:14 in which God gives his name as אֶהְיֶה אֲשֶׁר אֶהְיֶה (Ehyeh Asher Ehyeh), where the verb may be translated most basically as "I Am that I Am", "I shall be what I shall be", or "I shall be what I am". In the passage, YHWH, the personal name of God, is revealed directly to Moses.

Correlation between various theories and interpretation of the name of "the one God", used to signify a monotheistic or ultimate Supreme Being from which all other divine attributes derive, has been a subject of ecumenical discourse between Eastern and Western scholars for over two centuries. In Christian theology the word is considered a personal and a proper name of God. On the other hand, the names of God in a different tradition are sometimes referred to by symbols. The question whether divine names used by different religions are equivalent has been raised and analyzed.

Exchange of names held sacred between different religious traditions is typically limited. Other elements of religious practice may be shared, especially when communities of different faiths are living in close proximity (for example, the use of Khuda or Prabhu within the Indian Christian community) but usage of the names themselves mostly remains within the domain of a particular religion, or even may help define one's religious belief according to practice, as in the case of the recitation of names of God (such as the japa). Guru Gobind Singh's Jaap Sahib, which contains 950 names of God is one example of this. The Divine Names, the classic treatise by Pseudo-Dionysius, defines the scope of traditional understandings in Western traditions such as Hellenic, Christian, Jewish and Islamic theology on the nature and significance of the names of God. Further historical lists such as The 72 Names of the Lord show parallels in the history and interpretation of the name of God amongst Kabbalah, Christianity, and Hebrew scholarship in various parts of the Mediterranean world.

The attitude as to the transmission of the name in many cultures was surrounded by secrecy. In Judaism, the pronunciation of the name of God has always been guarded with great care. It is believed that, in ancient times, the sages communicated the pronunciation only once every seven years; this system was challenged by more recent movements. The nature of a holy name can be described as either personal or attributive. In many cultures it is often difficult to distinguish between the personal and the attributive names of God, the two divisions necessarily shading into each other.

The world's first religions were formed when the first civilizations were formed, and thus, the first instances of the Names of God appeared in these regions, including Egypt, Mesopotamia, the Levant, and other regions; this also includes the civilizations that would form and occupy the region in its future, such as the Achaemenid Empire, Ottoman Empire, and Iran.

== Abrahamic and related religions ==
=== Judaism ===
El comes from a root word meaning "god" or "deity", reconstructed in the Proto-Semitic language as ʾil. Sometimes referring to God and sometimes the mighty when used to refer to the God of Israel, El is almost always qualified by additional words that further define the meaning that distinguishes him from false gods. A common title of God in the Hebrew Bible is Elohim (Hebrew: אלהים). The root Eloah (אלה) is used in poetry and late prose (e.g., the Book of Job) and ending with the masculine plural suffix -im ים creating a word like ba`alim ('owners') and adonim ('lords', 'masters') that may also indicate a singular identity.

In the Book of Exodus, God commands Moses to tell the people that 'I AM' sent him, and this is revered as one of the most important names of God according to Mosaic tradition.

Moses said to God, "Suppose I go to the Israelites and say to them, 'The God of your fathers has sent me to you,' and they ask me, 'What is his name?' Then what shall I tell them?" God said to Moses, "I Am who I Am. This is what you are to say to the Israelites: 'I Am has sent me to you.'" God also said to Moses, "Say to the Israelites, 'The Lord, the God of your fathers—the God of Abraham, the God of Isaac and the God of Jacob—has sent me to you.' This is my name forever, the name you shall call me from generation to generation".

— Exodus 3:13–15

In Exodus 6:3, when Moses first spoke with God, God said, "I used to appear to Abraham, Isaac, and Jacob as El Shaddai, but I did not make myself known to them by my name YHWH."

YHWH (יהוה) is the proper name of God in Judaism. Neither vowels nor vowel points were used in ancient Hebrew writings and the original vocalisation of YHWH has been lost.

Later commentaries additionally suggested that the true pronunciation of this name is composed entirely of vowels, such as the Greek Ιαουε. However, this is put into question by the fact that vowels were only distinguished in the time-period by their very absence due to the lack of explicit vowels in the Hebrew script. The resulting substitute made from semivowels and glottals, known as the tetragrammaton, is not ordinarily permitted to be pronounced aloud, even in prayer. The prohibition on misuse (not use) of this name is the primary subject of the command not to take the name of the Lord in vain.

Instead of pronouncing YHWH during prayer, Jews say "Adonai" ('Lord'). Halakha requires that secondary rules be placed around the primary law, to reduce the chance that the main law will be broken. As such, it is common religious practice to restrict the use of the word "Adonai" to prayer only. In conversation, many Jewish people, even when not speaking Hebrew, will call God HaShem (השם), which is Hebrew for 'the Name'; this appears in Leviticus 24:11.

Almost all Orthodox Jews avoid using either Yahweh or Jehovah altogether on the basis that the actual pronunciation of the tetragrammaton has been lost in antiquity. Many use the term HaShem as an indirect reference, or they use "God" or "The Lord" instead. Mark Sameth argues that Yahweh was a pseudo name for a dual-gendered deity, the four letters of that name being cryptogram which the priests of ancient Israel read in reverse as huhi, 'he–she', as earlier theorized by Guillaume Postel (16th century) and Michelangelo Lanci (19th century).

=== Christianity ===
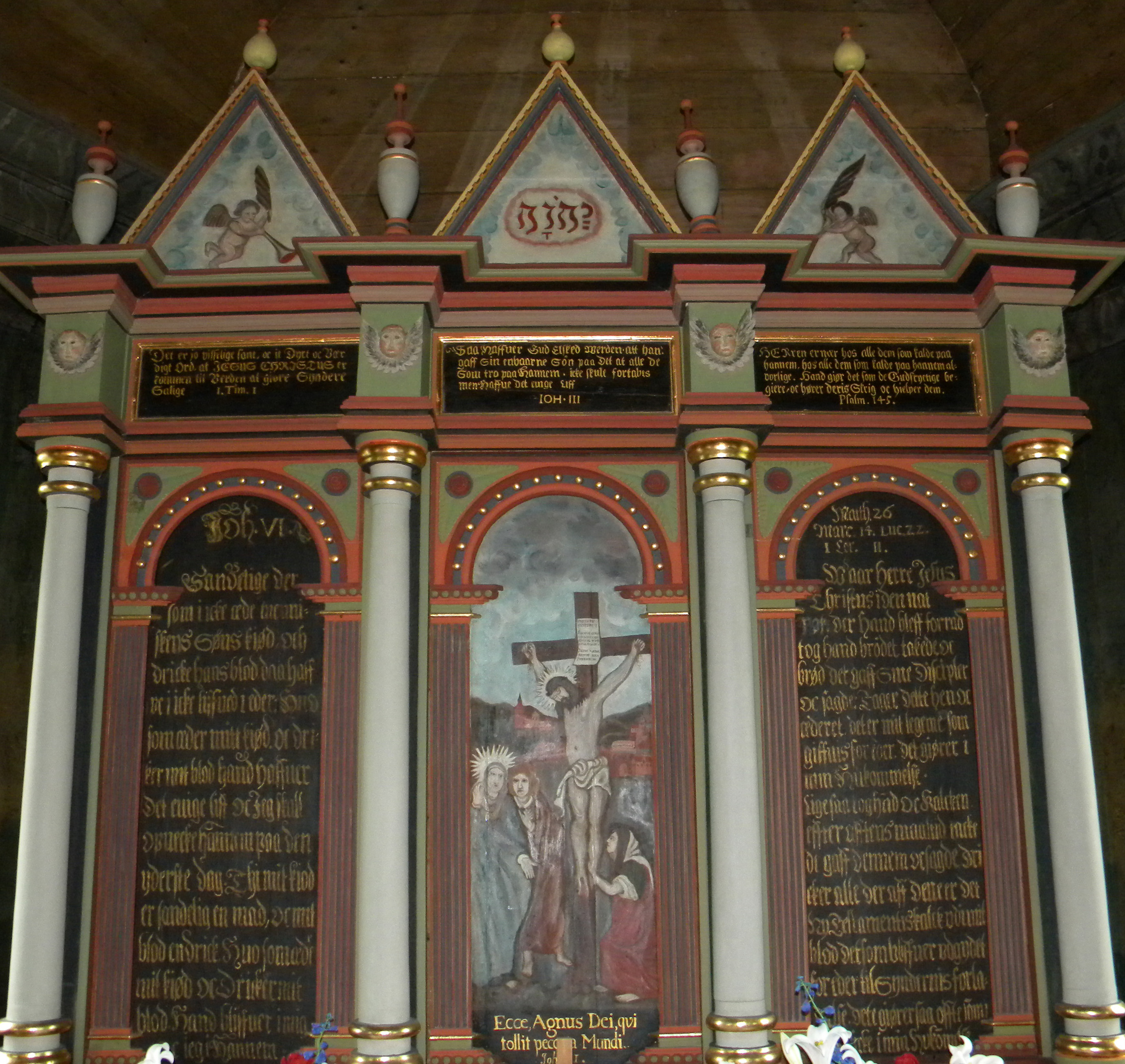
The Divine Name YHWH on a Lutheran Christian altar at Fiskebäckskil Church in Sweden

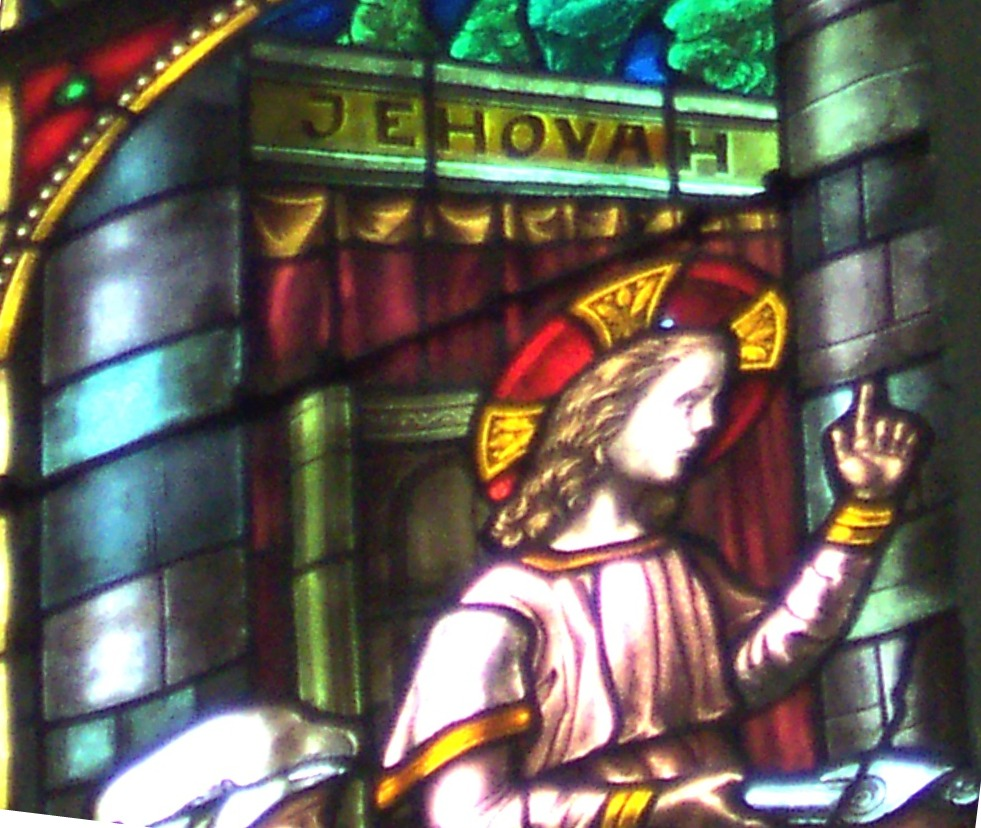
Jehovah, a vocalization of the Divine Name YHWH, on a stained glass window in of Saint-Fiacre de Dison Catholic Church in Belgium

In Christianity, the Old Testament reveals YHWH (יהוה; often vocalized with vowels as "Yahweh" or "Jehovah") as the personal name of God. References, such as The New Encyclopædia Britannica, affirm the vocalization "Yahweh" by offering additional specifics to its (Christian) reconstruction out of Greek sources:

Early Christian writers, such as Clement of Alexandria in the 2nd century, had used a form like Yahweh, and claim that this pronunciation of the tetragrammaton was never really lost. Other Greek transcriptions also indicated that YHWH should be pronounced Yahweh.

Jah or Yah (rendered as יָהּ in Hebrew) is an abbreviation of Jahweh/Yahweh/Jehovah. It appears in certain translations of the Bible, such as the Revised Standard Version, and is used by Christians in the interjection Hallelujah, meaning "Praise Jah", which is used to give Jahweh glory. In Christianity, certain hymns dedicated to God invoke the divine name using the vocalization Jehovah (יְהֹוָה, Yəhōwā), such as Guide Me, O Thou Great Jehovah.

The Hebrew personal name of God YHWH is rendered as "the LORD" in many translations of the Bible, with Elohim being rendered as "God"; certain translations of Scripture render the Tetragrammaton with Yahweh or Jehovah in particular places, with the latter vocalization being used in the King James Version, Tyndale Bible, and other translations of the Bible from that time period and later. Many English translations of the Bible (such as ESV, NIV, KJV, etc.) translate the tetragrammaton as LORD, thus removing any form of YHWH from the written text and going well beyond the Jewish oral practice of substituting Adonai for YHWH when reading aloud.

English Bible translations of the Greek New Testament render ho theos (Greek: Ο Θεός) as God and ho kurios (Greek: Ο Κύριος) as "the Lord", with the latter being the "Greek translation of the Hebrew OT name for God, Yahweh."

Jesus (Iesus, Yeshua) was a common alternative form of the name יְהוֹשֻׁעַ (Yehoshua 'Joshua') in later books of the Hebrew Bible and among Jews of the Second Temple period. The name corresponds to the Greek spelling Iesous, from which comes the English spelling Jesus. Christ means 'the anointed' in Greek (Χριστός). Khristos is the Greek equivalent of the Hebrew word Messiah; while in English the old Anglo-Saxon Messiah-rendering hæland ('healer') was practically annihilated by the Latin Christ, some cognates such as heiland in Dutch and Afrikaans survive—also, in German, the word Heiland is sometimes used as reference to Jesus, e.g., in church chorals).

In the Book of Revelation in the Christian New Testament, God, that is, Jesus is quoted as saying "I am the Alpha and the Omega, the First and the Last, the Beginning and the End". (cf. Rev. 1:8, 21:6, and 22:13)

Some Quakers refer to God with the title of the Light. Another term used is King of Kings or Lord of Lords and Lord of Hosts. In addition to the personal name of God YHWH (pronounced with the vocalizations Yahweh or Jehovah), titles of God used by Christians include the Hebrew titles Elohim, El-Shaddai, and Adonai, as well as Ancient of Days, Father/Abba which is Hebrew, "Most High". Abba ('father' in Hebrew) is a common term used for the creator within Christianity because it was a title Jesus used to refer to God the Father.

==== Church of Jesus Christ of Latter-day Saints ====
In Mormonism the name of God the Father is Elohim and the name of Jesus in his pre-incarnate state was Jehovah. Together, with the Holy Ghost they form the Godhead; God the Father, Jesus Christ, and the Holy Spirit. Mormons typically refer to God as "Heavenly Father" or "Father in Heaven".

Although Mormonism views the Father, the Son, and the Holy Spirit as three distinct beings, they are one in purpose and God the Father (Elohim) is worshipped and given all glory through his Son, Jesus Christ (Jehovah). Despite the Godhead doctrine, which teaches that God the Father, Jesus Christ and the Holy Ghost are three separate, divine beings, many Mormons (mainstream Latter-day Saints and otherwise, such as the Fundamentalist Church of Jesus Christ of Latter-Day Saints) view their beliefs as monotheist since Christ is the conduit through which humanity comes to the God the Father. The Book of Mormon ends with "to meet you before the pleasing bar of the great Jehovah, the eternal Judge of both the quick and dead. Amen."

==== Jehovah's Witnesses ====
Jehovah's Witnesses believe that God has a distinctive name, represented in the Old Testament by the Tetragrammaton. In English, they prefer to use the form Jehovah. According to their New World Translation of the Holy Scriptures, the name Jehovah means "He causes to become".

Though scholars prefer the form Yahweh, Jehovah's Witnesses maintain that the name Jehovah is the most well known form in English. Their literature compares the use of the form Jehovah in English to the widespread use of Jesus in English as a translation of Yeshua or Yehoshua.

=== Islam ===
The word Allah in thuluth calligraphy

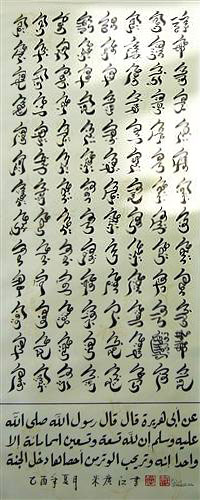
99 names of Allah, in Chinese Sini (script).

Allah—meaning 'the God' in Arabic—is the word for God in Islam. The word Allah has been used by Arabic people of different religions since pre-Islamic times. More specifically, it has been used as a term for God by Muslims (both Arab and non-Arab) and Arab Christians. God has many names in Islam. The Qur'an says (in translation) "to Him Belong the Best Names (Lahu Al-Asma' Al-Husna)"; examples include Ar-Rahman ('the Entirely Merciful') and Ar-Rahim ('the Especially Merciful'). Beside these Arabic names, Muslims of non-Arab origins may also sometimes use other names in their own languages to refer to God, such as Khuda in Persian, Bengali and Urdu. Tangri or Tengri was used in the Ottoman Turkish language as the equivalent of Allah.

He is Allah, other than whom there is no deity, Knower of the unseen and the witnessed. He is the Entirely Merciful, the Especially Merciful. He is Allah, other than whom there is no deity, the Sovereign, the Pure, the Perfection, the Bestower of Faith, the Overseer, the Exalted in Might, the Compeller, the Superior. Exalted is Allah above whatever they associate with Him. He is Allah, the Creator, the Inventor, the Fashioner; to Him belong the best names. Whatever is in the heavens and earth is exalting Him. And He is the Exalted in Might, the Wise. (Translation of Qur'an: Chapter 59, Verses 22-24)

==== Sufism ====
In Tasawwuf, often characterised as the inner, mystical dimension of Islam, Hu, Huwa (depends on placement in the sentence), or Parvardigar in Persian are used as names of God. The sound Hu derives from the last letter of the word Allah, which is read as Allahu when in the middle of a sentence. Hu means 'Just He' or 'Revealed'. The word explicitly appears in many verses of the Quran:

"La ilaha illa Hu"

— Al Imran:18

=== Baháʼí Faith ===
Calligraphy of the Greatest Name

The scriptures of the Baháʼí Faith often refer to God by various titles and attributes, such as Almighty, All-Possessing, All-Powerful, All-Wise, Incomparable, Gracious, Helper, All-Glorious, and Omniscient. Baháʼís believe the Greatest Name of God is "All-Glorious" or bahá in Arabic. Bahá is the root word of the following names and phrases: the greeting Alláh-u-Abhá ('God is the All-Glorious'), the invocation Yá Bahá'u'l-Abhá ('O Thou Glory of the Most Glorious'), Bahá'u'lláh ('the Glory of God'), and Baháʼí ('Follower of the All-Glorious'). These are expressed in Arabic regardless of the language in use (see Baháʼí symbols). Apart from these names, God is addressed in the local language, for example Ishwar in Hindi, Dieu in French and Dios in Spanish. Baháʼís believe Bahá'u'lláh, the founder of the Baháʼí Faith, is the "complete incarnation of the names and attributes of God".

=== Mandaeism ===
Mandaeans believe in one God called Hayyi Rabbi ('The Great Life' or 'The Great Living God'). Other names for God used include Mare d'Rabuta ('Lord of Greatness'), Mana Rabba ('The Great Mind'), Melka d'Nhura ('King of Light') and Hayyi Qadmaiyi ('The First Life').

== Iranian religions ==
=== Yazidism ===
Yazidism knows only one eternal God, often named Xwedê or Êzî. According to some Yazidi hymns (known as Qewls), God has 1001 names.

=== Zoroastrianism ===
In Zoroastrianism, 101 names of God (Pazand Sad-o-yak nam-i-khoda) is a list of names of God (Ahura Mazda). The list is preserved in Persian, Pazand and Gujarati. Parsi tradition expanded this to a list of 101 names of God.

== Indian religions ==
=== Hinduism ===
There are multiple names for God's various manifestations worshiped in Hinduism. Some of the common names for these deities in Hinduism are:

- Bhagavan (भगवान्) the most frequently used name for Lord in Hinduism. The equivalent term used for female deities is Bhagavati (भगवती).
- Brahman (ब्रह्मन्) is a theological concept espoused in Vedanta philosophy of Hinduism, which is of neuter gender. The word Paramatman (परमात्मन्) popularly pronounced as Paramatma (परमात्मा) is also used synonymously with it. The word is used to denote the Supreme Divinity/Supreme Soul.
- Isvara (ईश्वर) shortened as Isha (ईश) is applied to mean 'God' in both religious and secular context (for example in the Gita, Arjuna is referred to as Manujeshvara which is a compound of the two words manuja, 'human' and Ishvara, thus the word means 'God of humans', i.e. 'king'). The term Parameshvara ('Supreme God') is used to refer to one's Ishta (chosen deity for personal veneration) in general terms. The feminine equivalents are Isvari (ईश्वरी) and Parameshvari (परमेश्वरी) used in case of female deities.
- Deva/Devata (देव/देवता) is the most commonly used suffix used for male deities in Hinduism. The feminine equivalent is Devi (देवी).

Additionally, most Hindu deities have a collection of 8/12/16/32/100/108/1000/1008 names exclusively dedicated to them known as Namavali.

==== Tamil Tradition ====
- அருமன் (Arumaṉ) - The most giving.
- உய்யன் (Uyyaṉ) - The most high.
- இறைவன் (Iṟaivaṉ) - The one above all.
- இயவுள் (Iyavul) - who sets things in motion.
- கடவுள் (Kadavul) - The one who transcend the world and is hidden within)

=== Arya Samaj ===
Maharishi Dayanand in his book Satyarth Prakash has listed 100 names of God each representing some property or attribute thereof mentioning "Om" or "Aum" as God's personal and natural name.

=== Jainism ===
Jainism rejects the idea of a creator deity responsible for the manifestation, creation, or maintenance of this universe. According to Jain doctrine, the universe and its constituents (soul, matter, space, time, and principles of motion) have always existed. All the constituents and actions are governed by universal natural laws and an immaterial entity like God cannot create a material entity like the universe. Jainism offers an elaborate cosmology, including heavenly beings (devas), but these beings are not viewed as creators; they are subject to suffering and change like all other living beings, and must eventually die.

Jains define godliness as the inherent quality of any soul characterizing infinite bliss, infinite power, perfect knowledge and perfect peace. However, these qualities of a soul are subdued due to karmas of the soul. One who achieves this state of soul through right belief, right knowledge and right conduct can be termed as god. This perfection of soul is called kaivalya (omniscience). A liberated soul thus becomes a god – liberated of miseries, cycles of rebirth, world, karmas and finally liberated of body as well. This is called nirvana or moksha.

If godliness is defined as the state of having freed one's soul from karmas and the attainment of Kevala Jnana and a god as one who exists in such a state, then those who have achieved such a state can be termed gods/Tirthankara. Thus, Rishabhanatha was god/Tirthankara but he was not the only Tirthankara; there were many other Tirthankara. However, the quality of godliness is one and the same in all of them.

Jainism does not teach the dependency on any supreme being for enlightenment. The Tirthankara is a guide and teacher who points the way to enlightenment, but the struggle for enlightenment is one's own. Moral rewards and sufferings are not the work of a divine being, but a result of an innate moral order in the cosmos; a self-regulating mechanism whereby the individual reaps the fruits of his own actions through the workings of the karmas.

Jains believe that to attain enlightenment and ultimately liberation from all karmic bonding, one must practice the ethical principles not only in thought, but also in words (speech) and action. Such a practice through lifelong work towards oneself is called as observing the Mahavrata ('Great Vows').

Gods can be thus categorized into embodied gods also known as Tīrthankaras and Arihantas or ordinary Kevalis, and non-embodied formless gods who are called Siddhas. Jainism considers the devīs and devas to be souls who dwell in heavens owing to meritorious deeds in their past lives. These souls are in heavens for a fixed lifespan and even they have to undergo reincarnation as humans to achieve moksha.

=== Sikhism ===
There are multiple names for God in Sikhism. Some of the popular names for God in Sikhism are:

- Akal Purakh, meaning 'timeless being'.
- Ik Onkar, 'One Creator', found at the beginning of the Sikh Mul Mantar.
- Nirankar, meaning 'formless'.
- Satnam, meaning 'True Name'; some are of the opinion that this is a name for God in itself, others believe that this is an adjective used to describe the Gurmantar, Waheguru.
- Waheguru, meaning 'Wonderful Teacher bringing light to remove darkness'; this name is considered the greatest among Sikhs, and it is known as Gurmantar, 'the Guru's Word'. Waheguru is the only way to meet God.
- Dātā or Dātār, meaning 'the Giver'.
- Kartā or Kartār, meaning 'the Doer'.
- Diāl, meaning 'compassionate'.
- Kirpāl, meaning 'benevolent'.

In the Sikh scripture, both Hindu and Muslim names of the Supreme Being are also commonly employed, expressing different aspects of the divine Name. For instance, names like Ram ('pervading'), Hari ('shining'), Parmeshwar ('supreme lord'), and Jagdish ('world lord') refer to Hindu terms, while names like Allah (Arabic for God), Khuda (Persian for God), Rahim ('merciful'), Karim ('generous'), and Sahib ('lord') are of Muslim origin.

God, according to Guru Nanak, is beyond full comprehension by humans; has an endless number of virtues; takes on innumerable forms, but is formless; and can be called by an infinite number of names thus "Your Names are so many, and Your Forms are endless. No one can tell how many Glorious Virtues You have."

The word Allah (Punjabi: ਅਲਹੁ) is used 12 times in the Guru Granth Sahib (primary religious scripture) by Sheikh Farid. Guru Nanak Dev, Guru Arjan Dev and Bhagat Kabeer used the word 18 times.

== African religions ==
=== !Kung ===
The Supreme Being in !Kung mythology (known as Khu, Xu, Xuba, or Huwa) is the Creator and Upholder of life.

=== Egypt ===
A divine name is an official title for any divine being. In Egypt, divine names were indicated with a god's inscription (nṯr, which can be Anglicised as netjer.) In Sumerian cuneiform, the Dingir sign (𒀭) was used.

Asherah's title in KTU 1.4 mgn rbt is like Jupiter's title optimus maxiumus.

A divine being's name is distinct from an epithet. A divine epithet expresses specific traits, aspects, or domains of a god, or applies a common noun to them. Rahmouni says a locative name is ʔil yṯb bʕṯtrt in KTU 1.108, 2 meaning "The god who sits (enthroned) in ʕAṯtartu.

A name is sometimes double-barreled, like in Shagar-we-Ishtar or Kothar-wa-Hasis.

ʔṯrt w rḥmy Asherah-wa-Rachmai takes this ("binomial") form but is of slightly unclear categorization. In this case and that of the Lady of Byblos, it is not clear if the appellation is a personal name.

Binomial names can be found in "bound forms" like Bethel's Anat-Bethel, Ashim-Bethel, "and Herem-Bethel from the archives of Elephantine."

In one Egyptian story, the sun god Ra's true name was cunningly uncovered by Isis. Using a secret scheme, Isis gained complete dominion over Ra. This enabled her to elevate her son Horus to the throne, showing the power that a name had over the gods.

==== Appendages ====
The maiden goddesses of Canaan and Phoenicia were sometimes called the "name of the lord" (Ba'al) or the "face of the lord." In their less-virginal incarnations as the consort Anat-Bethel or as a mother goddess ʕtr [ʕ-t-r-m = ʕtr-(ʕ)m(y) "ʕtr my mother"] these and "hand of" the deity are added. This might mean hypostasis or intercession.

=== Odinani ===
Chukwu is the supreme being of the Odinani religion of the Igbo people. In the Igbo pantheon, Chukwu is the source of all other Igbo deities and is responsible for assigning them their different tasks. It is traditionally believed that all things come from Chukwu, who brings the rain necessary for plants to grow and controls everything on Earth and the spiritual world. Chukwu is described as an undefinable omnipotent and omnipresent supreme deity that encompasses everything in space and time itself. Igbo Christians also refer to the Abrahamic God as Chukwu.

=== West African Vodun ===
Nana Buluku is the female supreme being in West African Vodun. In Dahomey mythology, Nana Buluku is the mother supreme creator who gave birth to the moon spirit Mawu, the sun spirit Lisa, and all of the universe. After giving birth to these, she retired and left the matters of the world to Mawu-Lisa. She is the primary creator, Mawu-Lisa the secondary creator, and the theology based on these is called Vodun, Voodoo or Vodoun.

=== Iṣeṣẹ ===
The supreme being in Iṣẹṣẹ, the traditional religion of the Yoruba people, is known as Olorun or Olodumare. The Yoruba traditionally believe that Olodumare is omnipotent and is the source of all. Olodumare is aloof; he is not directly involved in earthly matters and lets other Yoruba deities (orisha), who are his sons and daughters, answer human concerns through divination, possession, sacrifice and more. However, everything is in the hands of Olodumare when they are going to bed at night. Yoruba Muslims and Christians also refer to the Abrahamic God as Olorun or Olodumare.

=== Zulu traditional religion ===
Unkulunkulu is the supreme creator in Zulu traditional religion. Unkulunkulu is believed to have brought human beings and cattle from an area of reeds. He is described as having created everything, from land and water, to man and the animals. He is considered the first man as well as the parent of all Zulu. He is traditionally believed to have taught the Zulu how to hunt, how to make fire, and how to grow food. Zulu Christians also refer to the Abrahamic God as Unkulunkulu.

== East Asian religions ==
=== In China ===
In China, belief systems can be considered to consist of four major traditions: the official belief system, the folk belief system, the Taoist belief system, and the Buddhist belief system. Among the first three—though none are monotheistic—there exists the concept of an origin deity or a supreme being.

==== Official Belief System ====
At the official level in classical China, from the Shang dynasty to the Qing dynasty, the supreme deity worshipped was known as Shangdi (上帝, literally "The Deity Above"), also referred to as Haotian Shangdi (昊天上帝, "Shangdi of the Vast Heaven"). The belief in Shangdi originated from ancient Chinese worship of the sky and the North Star. After Confucianism became the state orthodoxy, Shangdi continued to be revered as the highest deity.

==== Folk Belief System ====
Due to the solemnity of sacrificial rites, only the emperor was traditionally permitted to offer sacrifices to Shangdi in ancient China. As a result, common people rarely worshipped Shangdi directly. Instead, they venerated the Yudi (玉帝, literally "Jade Emperor"), also known as Yuhuang (玉皇) or Yuhuang Dadi (玉皇大帝). In fact, belief in the Jade Emperor is considered to have developed from the earlier belief in Shangdi.

==== Taoist Belief System ====
Taoism acknowledges the authority and status of the folk Jade Emperor, but it does not regard him as the supreme deity of the religion. Instead, the highest deities in Taoism are the Three Pure Ones.

=== In Japan ===
In Japan, within their native mythology and religion, there exists the concept of both an origin deity and a supreme being. The Kotoamatsukami were a collection of deities that predated most others, and the god known as Ame no Minakanushi (天之御中主神) (lit. 'Lord of the August Center of Heaven') served as the origin of the Universe. However, Japan is also home to many Japanese new religions which can be considered to be monotheistic or henotheistic. Some names for God as a supreme deity (rather than as a local kami) in various Japanese religions are:

- Kurozumikyo: Amaterasu
- Konkokyo: Tenchi-Kane-no-Kami (天地金乃神), or the "Golden Kami of Heaven and Earth" (in Japanese, "Heaven and Earth" also means the Universe)
- Tenrikyo: God the Parent (Japanese: Oyagami 親神), Tenri-Ō-no-Mikoto (天理王命) (lit. 'absolute ruler of divine reason'), Tsukihi (月日) (lit. 'Moon-Sun'), God of Origin (元の神), God in Truth (実の神)
- Oomoto: Oomoto-sume-oomikami (大天主太神) (lit. 'The Great Heavenly Lord, the Supreme God')
- Ananaikyo: the Great Spirit of the Universe (宇宙大精神, uchū daiseishin), or uchū tairei (宇宙大霊)
- PL Kyodan: Daigenrei (大元霊) (lit. 'Great Original Spirit') or Mioya Ōkami (大元霊) (lit. 'Great Parent God'), both of which are different readings of the same characters 大元霊
- Ennokyo: Ōmioya (大御親)
- Seicho-no-Ie: Refers to "God" or Kami using the character 神
- Mahikari: Su-god (ス神, su-kami)

== Native American religions ==
=== Anishinaabe ===
Gitche Manitou, also known as Gitchi Manitou, Kitchi Manitou, means "Great Spirit" in several Algonquian languages. Christian missionaries have translated God as Gitche Manitou in scriptures and prayers in the Algonquian languages.

== See also ==
- Bhadrakalpika Sūtra c. 200-250 CE, which gives names of 1002 Buddhas
- Creator deity
- Dingir
- Existence of God
- Lists of deities
- List of goddesses
- Sahasranama
- Tetragrammaton
- Vishnu Sahasranāma
- The Nine Billion Names of God, a short story by Arthur C. Clarke
