= Aniconism in the Baháʼí Faith =

Prohibition against images portraying God

The Baháʼí Faith continues a tradition found in Islam of not using depictions in art of people considered a Manifestation of God. This includes both images and drama. There exist several photographs and paintings of both the Báb and Baháʼu'lláh, and these are viewed by Baháʼís on rare occasions, typically on an organized pilgrimage to Haifa, Israel.

The existence of images of the religion's founders is not offensive to Baháʼís. However, they are encouraged to not display them in private homes or in public, and to treat them with a special degree of reverence and respect.

Shoghi Effendi, the appointed head of the religion from 1921 to 1957, wrote:

"There is no objection that the believers look at the picture of Baháʼu'lláh, but they should do so with the utmost reverence, and should also not allow that it be exposed openly to the public, even in their private homes."

(From a letter written on behalf of Shoghi Effendi to an individual believer, December 6, 1939, republished in Lights of Guidance, p. 540)

Shoghi Effendi has also written in the Directives from the Guardian regarding the portrait of the Báb:

"The portrait of the Báb should be regarded as an inestimable privilege and blessing to behold, as past generations were denied a glimpse of the Face of the Manifestation, once He had passed on."

(Shoghi Effendi, Directives from the Guardian, p. 43)

== See also ==
- Iconoclasm
- Aniconism
- Baháʼu'lláh
