= Alláh-u-Abhá =

Invocation in the Bahá'í Faith

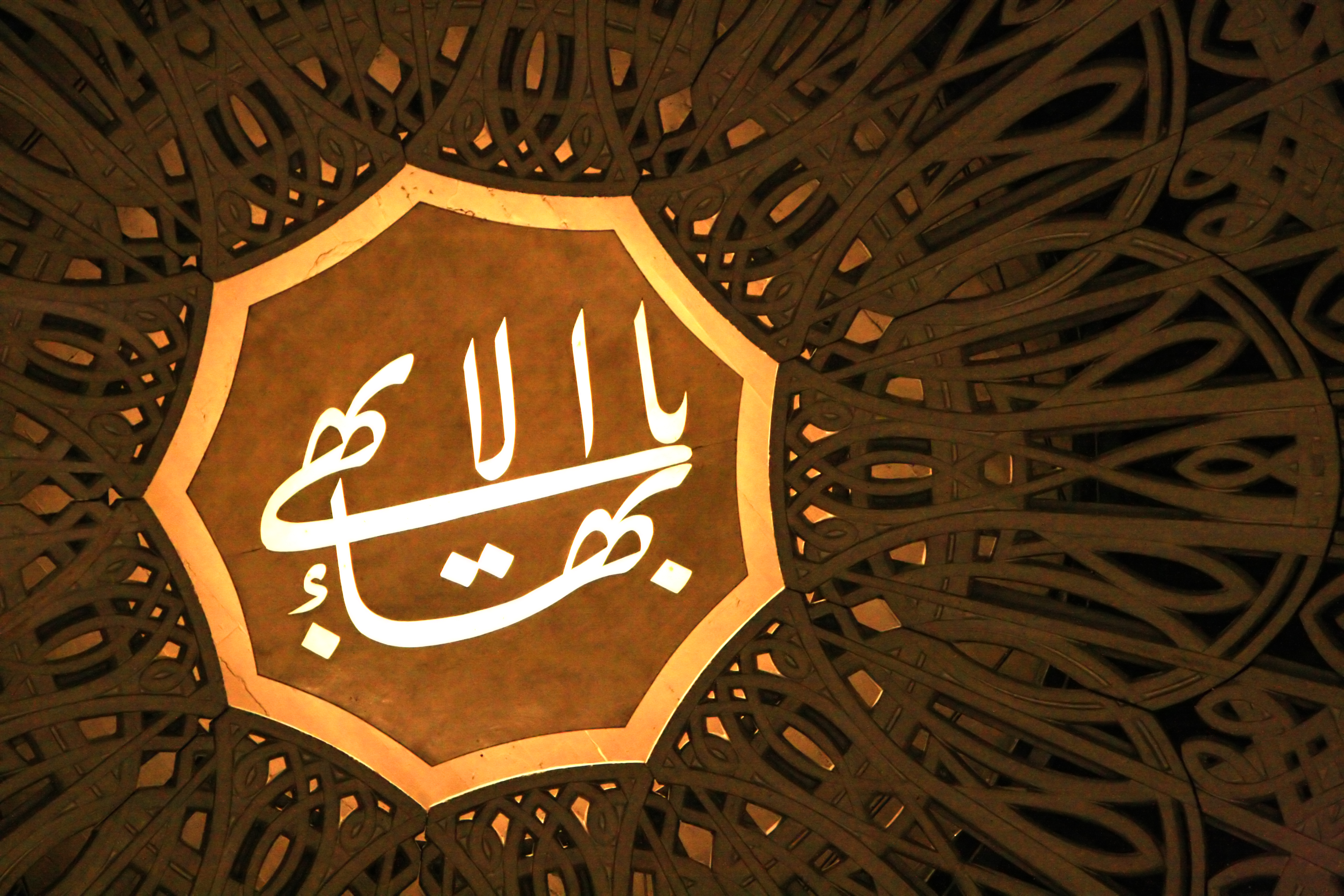
The calligraphy of the Greatest Name on a metal plate at the top of the interior of the Baháʼí House of Worship in Wilmette, Illinois.

Alláh-u-Abhá (Arabic: الله أبهى, Allāhu ʼAbhā: "God is Most Glorious") is an invocation in the Bahá'í Faith, and an expression of the "Greatest Name". It is used as a greeting that Baháʼís may use when they meet each other. It can be compared to the takbīr and tasbīḥ of Islam, i.e. the Arabic phrases Allāhu ʾAkbar ("God is Great") and Subḥān Allāh ("How Pure is God").

One of the obligations Baháʼu'lláh set for his followers is to engage in a daily meditation that involves repeating the phrase Alláh-u-Abhá 95 times. Nader Saiedi explains that the significance of the number 95 originates from the Persian Bayán, where the Báb states that ninety-five stands for the numerical value of "for God" (lillāh), symbolizing the recognition of the Manifestation of God and obedience to his laws, which are inseparable from each other, as confirmed by Baháʼu'lláh in the opening paragraph of the Kitáb-i-Aqdas.

The form Allāhu is the nominative case of Allāh. The form Abhā is the elative or superlative of the word Baháʼ, meaning "beauty, brilliancy". In Baháʼí writings, the "Greatest Name" is usually translated as "God is Most Glorious" or "God the All-Glorious".

== See also ==
- Ahl at-Tawhid
- Baháʼí Faith and the unity of religion
- Baháʼí symbols
- Baháʼí teachings
- Dhikr
- God in Abrahamic religions
  - God in the Baháʼí Faith
- Names of God
- Outline of the Baháʼí Faith
- Outline of theology
- Right hand of God
