= Baháʼí Faith on life after death =

The Baháʼí Faith affirms the existence of life after death while not defining everything about it. The soul on death is said to recognize the value of its deeds and begin a new phase of a conscious relationship with God, though negative experiences are possible.

== Death, dying, the soul and the afterlife ==
=== Teachings and beliefs ===
The soul is not considered subject to natural law. Instead, it is subject to spiritual law as a covenant between man and God, and it takes identity at the conception of the embryo, but not "in" the body, rather, associated with it like light to a mirror. The Baháʼí writings describe the mind–body dualism using various analogies to express the independence of the soul from the body. Human nature is likened to a rider on a horse or steed, a bird in a cage, or the sun shining on a mirror.

Heaven is a soul being close to God, not a place but a condition, as it undergoes an eternal spiritual evolution. Anyone who learns and applies virtues and guidance of God "goes to" heaven. Hell is similarly being far from God, not a place, but failing to understand and apply virtues and guidance from God. Progress from even the worst condition is possible even in the next world, but not until the individual fundamentally overcomes rejecting Godly virtues. The labels we call ourselves by and the theologies we claim to adhere to are not as important as the reality of spiritual virtues like courage, justice, love, understanding, etc., expressed by choice in our lives. Development of the spiritual life reaches a milestone whether in this life or the next in developing the "spirit of faith" a gift of the Holy Spirit, which then continues to grow in the individual's soul. But if our ability to express Godly virtues is conditional, so is our condition in the afterlife - there is a spectrum of achievement. Hence, a purgatory-like environment is possible for those who have not well embraced Godly virtues and those who have not largely rejected them. Indeed, the next world's life is sometimes delineated in stages. Baháʼís believe a significant purpose of revelation is to guide the spiritual development of the individual and that accepting the prophet of God is important as a significant chance at advancing the conditional achievement of discovering the virtues themselves and expressing them. If one succeeds in achieving these to a superlative degree then that person will be of benefit to all mankind from the afterlife while those who are far from God have no power to affect the living any more. Indeed, evil is not viewed as a power in the next world - people who are evil are described as "atrophied" and "enfeebled" and that accounts of "possession" are about people who have yielded to their own darker passions and baser nature.

Even though heaven is a condition more than a place, it is still described as a realm where those close to God are also close to each other. Thus in the afterlife one encounters the prophets of old and other historical people. While the individual experiences dramatic changes from birth and the stages of life in this world, then death and life beyond, Baháʼís hold that it is the same soul, the same sense of identity, through the dramatic changes of circumstances. However, the worlds of the womb, life in this world, and the life beyond are actually interwoven. It's not like moving to a distant place - the afterlife is also "here", unseen by those living on earth. Life in this world and life in that one affect this. Death is about letting go of the physical frame and its requirements, and has no real identity itself.

Judgement Day is perceived to be about the time after a new Revelator when the followers of the former dispensation are judged/tested. If they are affirmed they are "raised" or "return" (not as individuals but as types of people, like John the Baptist was the return of Elijah but not Elijah himself.) The circumstances of mass "resurrection" in the last days refers to when the process will be world embracing rather than in one country or people or another. This is also one of many reasons why Baháʼís do not believe in the literal return to earth of the same individual soul as is believed by those who hold to reincarnation. Thus this Judgement Day is not the same as the judgement that happens after death but there too there is a judgement and the reality behind the words one lived by are measured. Rewards for correctly applying virtues and punishments for incorrectly doing so are settled, but ongoing learning still takes place starting in the last moments of earthly life. Baháʼís believe we will know and converse with those we have known and those who have already died.

Expressing information about the afterlife is inherently limited in this life. It is explained that the next life is fundamentally different in many ways from this life. The parallel is made comparing life in the womb with this life and the changes from birth to death. Realities of the latter are not available even as concepts in the former - they are ineffable. The idea of a body in the next world is still present, but it is a heavenly body. There is a realm of lights and reunion with deceased associates. God will be witnessed as if it were a sun in the sky, but there is no night. The sanctity of human nature is affirmed when it reflects the light of God and the truths of existence become known, a basic fear of death is overcome, and a universal acceptance of the religions as coming from one source.

=== Laws and rules ===
Among the specific rules Baháʼís are to try to follow concerning death are, depending on the civil law of their country:

- No cremation or embalming. It is not harming the soul itself, but the body is to be respected, not destroyed or harmed in general. Donation to science is allowed if the other rules can be followed.
- Suicide is seen as a rejection of God's plan for humans and is forbidden to followers of the religion. The religion teaches that the souls of adherents can "suffer spiritually" if they commit suicide, but recommends that bereaving families be comforted.
- No mourning rituals are specified, but there is a shared prayer for the dead to be read for Baháʼís.
- There is a ring with an inscription that Baháʼís should wear when buried, and the body wrapped in a shroud. The inscription should read (in whatever translation of language) "I came forth from God and return unto Him, detached from all save Him, holding fast to His Name, the Merciful, the Compassionate."
- Interment of the body should be in a coffin.
- Burial should take place no more than an hour's travel from the place of death.
- The appropriate marker on the gravestone is a nine-pointed star and/or the word Baháʼí. Other inscriptions are allowed but not required.
- Baháʼí-run funerals for non-Baháʼís require none of these requirements.
- Infants who die are under the mercy and bounty of God.

Mourning, the distress and pain of the loss of contact with friends and kin for Baháʼís is, aside from cultural issues and norms in society, characterized as another stage of life. This temporary condition will be changed someday, just as someday the infant in the womb comes into the material world through birth and into the company of family and friends. Not avoiding the sense of loss, Baháʼu'lláh emphasizes the sense of mystery in death, pointing out that though he has shared some aspects of death and afterlife:

""The Mysteries of man's physical death and of his return have not been divulged, and still remain unread… Were they to be revealed, they would evoke such fear and sorrow that some would perish, while others would be so filled with gladness as to wish for death, and beseech, with unceasing longing, the one true God – exalted be His Glory – to hasten their end."

As this is not apparent to anyone, instead we struggle with the fact of death.

Baháʼís do allow for cultural norms of the societies they live in. For example, among the indigenous of Papua New Guinea, Christian missionaries had openly opposed traditional funerary art and performances while the Baháʼís encouraged their production as a form of worship. Thus, while Nalik Baháʼís are regarded by other Naliks as arbiters of traditional knowledge and practices, the Christian missions and their followers are seen as antagonistic to kastom.

Baháʼís view prayers in this world as useful to those who have passed on, as are indeed their prayers for us still living in this world. Additionally remembering the lives of those who died, their achievements of virtues, and services carried out in their name is actually of assistance to those who have died.

=== Impressions of a Baháʼí point of view on death and the afterlife ===
A Practical Reference to Religious Diversity for Operational Police and Emergency Services is designed to offer guidance to police and emergency services personnel on how religious affiliation can affect their contact with the public. The second edition, published in 2002 in Australia, mentioned norms that could be expected of Baháʼís in the case of dying or death. It states that Baháʼís believe in life after death, holding that the soul is created at the moment of conception and will retain its individuality in an eternal realm. The body, which is compared to the lamp holding the light of the soul during its time in this world, should be treated with dignity. Embalming is not to take place unless required by law. The body should be transported as little as possible after death, and interment must take place within an hour's travel time from the city or town where death occurs. Cremation is forbidden. Its scriptures say that "the soul is a sign of God, a heavenly gem whose reality the most learned of men hath failed to grasp, and whose mystery no mind, however acute, can ever hope to unravel." These points are noted in other sources as well. Sociologist researchers have observed that Baháʼís have an inclusivistic belief that although it may take work, most people will eventually be saved or get to heaven.

Television coverage of the prayer vigil on CNN and C-Span for the Sandy Hook Elementary School shooting included Baháʼí scripture to console the living so that their affect of the recently dead was less disruptive. The text used at the service was adapted to apply to parents and children and taken from Selections From the Writings of ʻAbdu'l-Bahá:

…the loss of a son is indeed heart-breaking and beyond the limits of human endurance, yet one who knoweth and understandeth is assured that the son hath not been lost but, rather, hath stepped from this world into another, and she will find him in the divine realm. That reunion shall be for eternity, while in this world separation is inevitable and bringeth with it a burning grief.

Praise be unto God that thou hast faith, art turning thy face toward the everlasting Kingdom and believest in the existence of a heavenly world. Therefore be thou not disconsolate, do not languish, do not sigh, neither wail nor weep; for agitation and mourning deeply affect his soul in the divine realm.

That beloved child addresseth thee from the hidden world: 'O thou kind Mother, thank divine Providence that I have been freed from a small and gloomy cage and, like the birds of the meadows, have soared to the divine world—a world which is spacious, illumined, and ever gay and jubilant. Therefore, lament not, O Mother, and be not grieved; I am not of the lost, nor have I been obliterated and destroyed. I have shaken off the mortal form and have raised my banner in this spiritual world. Following this separation is everlasting companionship. Thou shalt find me in the heaven of the Lord, immersed in an ocean of light.'

=== Baháʼí literature ===
The related topics of death, dying, the soul, and the afterlife are of interest in the religion, covered at length in the lifetimes of the central figures of the religion through questions asked by enquirers, and then these scriptures are repeatedly compiled in books.

The Divine Art of Living is one such early work that has a chapter, The Realm of Immortality, which has section headings of: The Nature of the Soul, Punishments and Rewards, The Release of the Spirit, Life in the Next World, Consolation for the Bereaved, Prayers for the Departed. The early content originally appeared in successive issues of World Order magazine from April 1940 to September 1941 and was then reprinted and revised in a single volume in 1944, 1946, 1949, 1953, 1956, 1960, 1965, 1970, 1972, 1973, 1974, 1979, 1986, 2006. Baháʼís have held conferences of the same name. The massive compilation Lights of Guidance: A Baháʼí Reference File published in 1983 had sections covering scriptural compilations on the topics. Approximately 10 books were published directly on the topic of life after death. In America the manual for Baháʼí Local Assemblies, Developing Distinctive Baháʼí Communities, chapter 19, covers specifics burial practices and related topics and volume 1 of the Compilations of Compilations has an entry similarly titled. These topics were continued more recently in the Ruhi Institute project in its first workbook Reflections on the Life of the Spirit under the section "Life and Death", as well as many articles, sections or chapters in books, and whole books both scholarly and institutional.

== Near-death experiences ==
=== Literature ===
In addition to outlining scriptural references examining the afterlife some have specifically examined parallels between the statements in the scriptures and scholarly statements about stages of near-death experiences, notably:

- Light After Death originally published in 1993 and reprinted in 1997 and 2003 2004 and 2006 and is also offered free online where the author notes"…this book was never about money or profit." and "Proceeds from this book have been donated to the Rabbani School" (a Baháʼí school in India.) Across 112 pages he outlines chapters on realm of light, being of light, reunion, universal knowledge, ineffability, the soul, immortality, the transformation of values that results and compares these with scriptural references of the religion.
- The Purpose of Physical Reality published in 1987 and revised in 2005 has a chapter to this purpose: "The Eternal Consequences of our Physical Performance: Hell, Heaven or "None of the Above". Across 31 pages in his chapter he outlines sections on fear of death, passage to the next world, the effects of NDE on contemporary attitudes about the afterlife, dissociation of soul and body, awareness of other souls, the ineffable nature of the experience, the purpose of life, negative experiences in the afterlife, accountability, a loving and forgiving God, self-judgment, and bewildered ones again discussing and comparing each subject with Baháʼí scriptural references.
- The Handbook of Near-Death Experiences: Thirty Years of Investigation has a chapter, "World Religions and Near-Death Experiences" by Farnaz Masumian, which reviews across religions. About 4 and a half pages are spent on the Baháʼí Faith's comparisons.

Many qualities reported by NDErs find parallels in Baháʼí writings - the quality of the experience being ineffable, having a heavenly body, a realm of light, meeting others, reviewing one's life, and meeting a superlative being of light. Additionally the kinds of positive transformation the NDErs report also find parallels in the values Baháʼís are encouraged to seek - a new appreciation of knowledge and learning, the importance of love, an absence of fear of death, the importance of physical life on earth, a belief in the sanctity of human nature, and an emphasis on manifesting such positive attributes as love, justice, selfless service, unity, and peace - something viewed by NDErs and Baháʼís as being important to all religions and rising above specifics of doctrines and sectarianism. Negative experiences of NDErs are also paralleled in Baháʼí writings - the effect of suicide, the prospect of "limbo" for "breaking the rules", that when taking the chance to learn from mistakes is important and that the life review includes facing the negative deeds done, even of hellish experiences.

In a paper describing patterns of understanding spiritual dreams and visions by Necati Alkan, ʻAbdu'l-Bahá, a key authority in the Baháʼí Faith, sometimes separates dreams and visions into three categories: true, interpretative, and confused. The first do not need interpretation but depend on having, according to ʻAbdu'l-Bahá in the words of Necati Alkan, "a heart rid of all attachment and there must not exist idle thoughts in the mind." The second can be decoded for the truth, and the third only reflect "the strife and contention" of the experiencer. According to ʻAbdu'l-Bahá, the work of decoding the second type is like, in Necati Alkan words, "if you add any colour to a white cloth, it will accept it; but if you add blue to a yellow cloth, it will become green and the truth is distorted. In order to have the true colour, one needs to remove the added colour." Indeed, sometimes ʻAbdu'l-Bahá notes such experiences can mean the opposite of what they seem.

=== Personal presentations ===
In addition to general reviews of the statements of scriptures and comparisons of them with near death experiences in general there are a few individuals who have had their experiences published and shared.

==== Reinee Pasarow ====
Reinee Pasarow has presented her experiences which she relates to the religion. She published her story as early as 1981. At least one extended talk was video taped and is available online in a couple places. There are also extended partial transcripts. The talk has been analyzed from a religious point of view in a commentary and beyond. There is also an audio file of a similar but not identical talk. She felt her relationship with the religion came as a direct result of her NDE. In 2018 she published a book Answers from Heaven: The Near-Death Experiences of Reinee Pasarow in which she says she shared the story with Ruhiyyih Khanum and told her she had to tell her story.

==== Ricky Bradshaw ====
P. M. H. Atwater claims Ricky Bradshaw co-founded International Association for Near-Death Studies (IANDS) with Dr. Kenneth Ring. He also joined the Baháʼí Faith as it was the best fit to his experiences in his view. His experience was reviewed in a number of publications and there are references to Bradshaw publishing his experience in some early journals not online indicating it was published in an early version of an NDE journal named (at the time) Anabiosis: Journal of Near Death Studies, August 1979, page 11.

==== Others mentioned in relation to the religion ====
In addition to the above, two others have reported NDEs and have some relationship to the religion. In Atwater's more recent book Near-Death Experiences, the Rest of the Story: What They Teach Us about Living and Dying and Our True Purpose on p. 257 Atwater records an anecdote of another reference to the religion:

"It is my opinion," said Teri, "that Michael has been living with the aftereffects since childhood. One afternoon he called me and asked if I wanted to go to church with him. I said no, but I would love to take him to Baháʼí Temple in Wilmette. After climbing the stairs to the Temple together we walked in a circle, reading inscriptions over the doors. Over one set of doors, facing East, we paused to read, "Ye are the fruits of one tree and the leaves of one branch.' I looked up at Michael as tears welled in his eyes. I could feel his pain and frustration. It was the kind of frustration that comes with the knowledge of having crossed over, of having been 'there', of having returned from the threshold of death carrying his message for mankind with a remote memory of 'the other side'."

Nina Lembcke Holte Harvey has been interviewed by Warren Odess-Gillett on "A Baháʼí Perspective" for WXOJ-LP about her NDEs in her childhood.

Chief Albert Isaac of Aishihik is recorded as having identified a near death experience of his in 1957 with the Baháʼí Faith.

Marie Watson, author of Two Paths in 1897, says she had a car accident in 1890 in Washington DC and reported having a vision and met a guide. She converted to the religion in 1901 and identified the guide as ʻAbdu'l-Bahá.

== See also ==
- Baháʼí cosmology
- Baháʼí teachings
- Baháʼí views on sin
- Guy Murchie's The Seven Mysteries of Life
- Rūḥ, the soul in Islam and Sufism
- Nafs
