= World Unity Conference =

Series of Baháʼí sponsored events

The World Unity Conferences were a series of Baháʼí sponsored conferences to promote World Unity. There was also a World Unity magazine.

Both appear to have been short-lived.

== List of conferences ==
- October 22–24, 1926, Buffalo, N.Y.
- Promoting the Oneness of Mankind: Cleveland, November 26–28, 1926.
- Create Harmony and Understanding Among Religions, Races, Nations and Classes: Morrison Hotel, Chicago, January 21–23, 1927.
- Create Harmony and Understanding Among Religions, Races, Nations and Classes: Portsmouth, N.H., February 18–21, 1927.
- Promoting the Oneness of Mankind: New York, February 25–27, 1927.
- Create Harmony and Understanding Among Religions, Races, Nations and Classes: Hotel Taft, New Haven, March 25, 26, 27, 1927.
- Create Harmony and Understanding Among Religions, Races, Nations and Classes: Montreal 1927, April 19, Ritz Carlton Hotel, April 30, McGill University, May 1, Church of the Messiah.
- Create Harmony and Understanding Among Religions, Races, Nations and Classes: Hotel Bond, Hartford, CT June 1–3, 1927.
