= Baháʼí views on sin =

The Baháʼí Faith teaches that sin is disobedience to God and that sinning separates a person from God. Examples of sins in the Baháʼí Faith include anger, jealousy, hypocrisy, prejudice, and failure to follow the Baháʼí laws. Conversely, Baháʼís believe that God will forgive sins for which a person repents, and people can draw nearer to God by developing spiritual qualities. The Baháʼí teachings do not accept the doctrine of original sin, instead teaching that babies come into the world without sin. Also, the Baháʼí teachings hold that Manifestations of God do not sin.

== See also ==
- Baháʼí Faith on life after death
- God in the Baháʼí Faith
