= Foundations of World Unity =

Foundations of World Unity is a collection of talks and writings of ʻAbdu'l-Bahá, leader of the Baháʼí Faith, dated prior to his death in November 1921, and first published in 1945. The introduction to the 1945 edition is dated 1927.

It includes mainly selected talks from Promulgation of Universal Peace, and a few passages from Baháʼí Scriptures, Selections from the Writings of ʻAbdu'l-Bahá and Some Answered Questions.

== Contents ==
- The True Modernism
- The Source Of Reality
- The Dawn Of Peace
- The Cause Of Strife
- Universal Peace
- The Prophets And War
- Foundations Of World Unity
- Racial Harmony
- The Spirit Of Justice
- Cooperation
- The Criteria Of Truth
- Man And Nature
- The Microcosm And The Macrocosm
- The Universal Cycles
- Education
- The Holy Spirit
- Science
- Spiritual Springtime
- Eternal Unity
- The Darkened Lights
- The Need Of Divine Education
- Religion: Essential And Non-Essential
- Religion Renewed
- Divine Love
- The Foundation Of Religion
- The Quickening Spirit
- The Law Of God
- Continuity Of Revelation

== See also ==
- World Unity Conference
