= World Religion Day =

International holiday

- Observed by: Baháʼís, interfaith and multi-faith organizations
- Type: International, cultural
- Significance: Celebration of the oneness of religion and its role in human society
- Date: Third Sunday in January
- 2025 date: January 19
- 2026 date: January 18
- 2027 date: January 17
- 2028 date: January 16
- Frequency: annual
- First time: December 8, 1949

World Religion Day is an observance that was initiated in 1950 by the National Spiritual Assembly of the Baháʼís of the United States, which is celebrated worldwide on the third Sunday in January each year. Though initiated in the United States, World Religion Day has come to be celebrated internationally by followers of the Baháʼí Faith.

Described as a "Baháʼí-inspired idea that has taken on a life of its own", the origins of World Religion Day lie in the Baháʼí principles of the oneness of religion and of progressive revelation, which describe religion as evolving continuously throughout the history of humanity. The purpose of World Religion Day is to highlight the ideas that the spiritual principles underlying the world's religions are harmonious, and that religions play a significant role in unifying humanity.

== Purpose ==
Initially a Baháʼí observance, World Religion Day was inspired by the Baháʼí principles of the oneness of religion and of progressive revelation, which describe religion as evolving continuously throughout the history of humanity. It promotes these principles by highlighting the ideas that the spiritual principles underlying the world's religions are harmonious, and that religions play a significant role in unifying humanity.

As a means of clarifying the nature and purpose of World Religion Day, the Universal House of Justice, the elected council that serves as the head of the Baháʼí Faith noted in a 1968 message that, rather than providing a "platform for all religions and their emergent ecumenical ideas," the observance serves as "a celebration of the need for and the coming of a world religion for mankind, the Baháʼí Faith itself."

In April 2002, the Universal House of Justice published a letter, "To the World's Religious Leaders", in which it stated:

...interfaith discourse, if it is to contribute meaningfully to healing the ills that afflict a desperate humanity, must now address honestly ... the implications of the over-arching truth ... that God is one and that, beyond all diversity of cultural expression and human interpretation, religion is likewise one.

World Religion Day has been described as a "Baháʼí-inspired idea that has taken on a life of its own", because its observance is no longer confined to the Baháʼí community, where it originally took shape. Although observances of World Religion Day are still sponsored and supported by Baháʼí communities worldwide, Baha'i institutions such as the Universal House of Justice or the National Spiritual Assembly of the Baháʼís of the United States no longer play active roles in the promotion of events, apart from reporting on them. Instead, an increasing number of observances are independently organized by interfaith or multi-faith coalitions.

== History ==
The earliest observation entitled "World Peace Through World Religion" was in Portland, Maine, at the Eastland Park Hotel in October 1947 with a talk by Firuz Kazemzadeh. In 1949 observances in various communities in the United States made the local newspapers in December called "World Religion Day". It was standardized across the United States by the National Spiritual Assembly of the Baháʼís of the United States in December 1949 to be held January 15, 1950. It also began to be observed internationally starting as early as in Australia in 1950 in two cities and Bolivia in 1951. By 1958 Baháʼís had gathered notices of events in a number of countries—sometimes attracting hundreds of people and sometimes overlapping with race amity priorities. In Laos, for example, meetings were noted in 1958, 1959, and 1960, among many countries activities. In the Netherlands in 1962 it was noted in several cities.

=== More pronounced awareness ===
The observance has grown in some scale of recognition beginning in the 1950s.

It was noted on various AM radio stations in the 1950s and 1960s:

- (formerly) KVSM (1951, San Francisco Bay Area)
- (formerly) KCNA (1951, Tucson area)
- KFAR (1951, 1960, and 1962, Fairbanks, Alaska)
- (formerly) KTIM (1954, San Francisco Bay Area),
- WIOU (AM) (1955, Kokomo, Indiana)
- WGVA (1956, Geneva, New York)
- KVNA (AM) (1957, Flagstaff, Arizona)

Various noted speakers gave talks in the 1950s to the 1970s:

- O. Z. Whitehead, actor and writer
- Dwight W. Allen, professor of education and reformer
- Stanwood Cobb, educator and reformer
- Hilda Yen, diplomat and aviator
- Robert B. Powers, police chief and writer
- William Sears, television and radio personality

A number of locales saw Mayoral proclamations in the United States and Canada in the 1960s and 1970s:

- 1966 – Reno Nevada and Portsmouth, New Hampshire
- 1967 – Arcadia, California
- 1969 – Carbondale, Illinois
- 1973 – Hamburg, New York
- 1974 and 1975 – Brandon, Manitoba
- 1977 – Hamburg, New York,

In 1968 the proclamation was issued by Warren E. Hearnes, Governor of Missouri.

=== Stamps ===
In 1985 Sri Lanka issued the first World Religion Day postage stamp. This was followed by a stamp issued by the Republic of the Congo in 2007. The Congo stamp showed a globe with the symbols of 11 religions surrounding it, and the text (in French) read, "God is the source of all religions."

=== Modern observance ===
There is a long tradition of hosting panels and symposia with representatives of many religions at World Religion Day observances.

After years of activity since 2000 in 2011 Ottawa city government hosted an event that was video taped. It was subsequently noted in 2014 on CTV Television Network.

Since 2013 participants have gathered at a virtual presentation in Second Life at the UUtopia Center for an observance. The 2014 observance had screenshots taken. The 2015 event of talks of a panel of speakers was recorded.

In 2013 the Parliament of Religions noted it. The Oxford University Press' blog noted it in 2015.

== See also ==
- World Interfaith Harmony Week
