= God Passes By =

God Passes By, written by Shoghi Effendi, head of the Baháʼí Faith in the first half of the 20th century, is a book which provides a historical summary of the first century of the Baháʼí Faith, from 1844 to 1944. While historical episodes are recounted in some detail, "God Passes By" is particularly notable for the significance Shoghi Effendi assigns to events in the history of the Baháʼí Faith, and the interpretation he gives to various episodes.

== Contents ==
God Passes By is organized into four periods representing different periods in the history of the Bábí and Baháʼí Faiths.

=== The Ministry of the Báb (1844-1853) ===
This section of the book recounts the life of the Báb, details his most significant and outstanding religious writings, describes the rise and development of the Babi Faith, and the turbulence and persecution which the followers of that faith experienced.

=== The Ministry of Baháʼu'lláh (1853-1892) ===
This section of the book describes the major episodes in the life of Baháʼu'lláh, details his most significant religious writings, recounts both the external persecution of the Baha'is by the Ottoman and Persian governments and the internal crisis within the Baha'i community precipitated by the rebellion of Mirza Yahya against Baha'u'llah's authority, and ends with the death of Baha'u'llah in Akka.

=== The Ministry of ʻAbdu'l-Bahá (1892-1921) ===
This section of the book describes the major episodes in the life of ʻAbdu'l-Bahá, details the nature of and challenges to Baha'u'llah's Covenant with his followers regarding succession of leadership within the Baha'i Faith, recounts the continued persecutions of Baha'is in various parts of the world, describes the travels of ʻAbdu'l-Baha throughout the West, and ends with the death of ʻAbdu'l-Baha.

=== The Inception of the Formative Age of the Baháʼí Faith (1921-1944) ===
This section of the book describes the 23 years of Baha'i history following the death of ʻAbdu'l-Baha, with particular emphasis on the provisions and implications of his last Will and Testament, the development of the Baha'i Administrative Order, and the expansion and multiplication of Baha'i communities throughout the world.

== See also ==
- Advent of Divine Justice
- The Dawn-breakers
