= Baháʼí symbols =

Symbols used in the Baháʼí Faith

The nine-pointed star is a symbol of the Bahá'í Faith

There are several symbols used to express identification with the Baháʼí Faith: the nine-pointed star, a calligraphy known as the "Greatest Name", the Ringstone Symbol, or a five-pointed star.

== Nine-pointed star ==
According to the Abjad system of isopsephy, the word Baháʼ has a numerical equivalence of 9, and thus there is frequent use of the number 9 in Baháʼí symbols. The most common of these is the nine-pointed star,; there is no particular design of the nine-pointed star that is used more often than others. While the star is not a part of the teachings of the Baháʼí Faith, it is commonly used as an emblem representing "9", because of the association of number 9 with perfection, unity and Baháʼ.

The number 9 also comes up several times in Baháʼí history and teachings. On the significance of the number 9, Shoghi Effendi wrote:

Concerning the number nine: the Baháʼí's reverence this for two reasons, first because it is considered by those interested in numbers as the sign of perfection. The second consideration, which is the more important one, is that it is the numerical value of the word "Bahá"[.]
Besides these two significances the number nine has no other meaning. It is, however, enough to make the Baháʼís use it when an arbitrary number is to be chosen.

Its use on gravestone markers was approved by Shoghi Effendi, then head of the religion, in 1944.

On 13 September 2022, the symbol was added to Unicode as U+1F7D9 🟙 NINE POINTED WHITE STAR.

== Five-pointed star ==
The five-pointed star, pentagram, or haykal (Arabic: temple) is a symbol of the Baháʼí Faith as mentioned by Shoghi Effendi, head of the Baháʼí Faith in the first half of the 20th century: "Strictly speaking the 5-pointed star is the symbol of our Faith, as used by the Báb and explained by Him." The five-pointed star has been used as the outline of special letters or tablets by both the Báb and Baháʼu'lláh.

Haykal is a tetragram loan word from the Hebrew word hēyḵāl, which means temple and specifically Solomon's Temple in Jerusalem. In Arabic, the word also means the body or form of something, particularly the human body. In the Baháʼí tradition, the haykal was established by the Báb—and represents the human body as a head, two hands, and two feet. The Báb wrote many letters, tablets, prayers and more in the shape of a five-pointed star, including some that included many derivatives of the word Baháʼ (see below). In other Persian and Arabic Baháʼí Writings, haykal is also used in a general context to refer to corporate organisations, the human body politic, etc.

Baháʼu'lláh wrote the Súriy-i-Haykal (Tablet of the Temple) in the shape of a five-pointed star. "Haykal" has been rendered with the consonants HYKL in English translations of the Tablet. While the meaning of temple remains present, the haykal is used mainly to mean the human body, but particularly the body of the Manifestation of God—a messenger from God—and the person of Baháʼu'lláh himself. In the Tablet, the haykal is also used to refer to the word of God, which is revealed by the Manifestations of God. He also says in the same Tablet:

"O Living Temple! We have, in very truth,...ordained Thee to be the emblem of My Cause betwixt the heavens and the earth..."

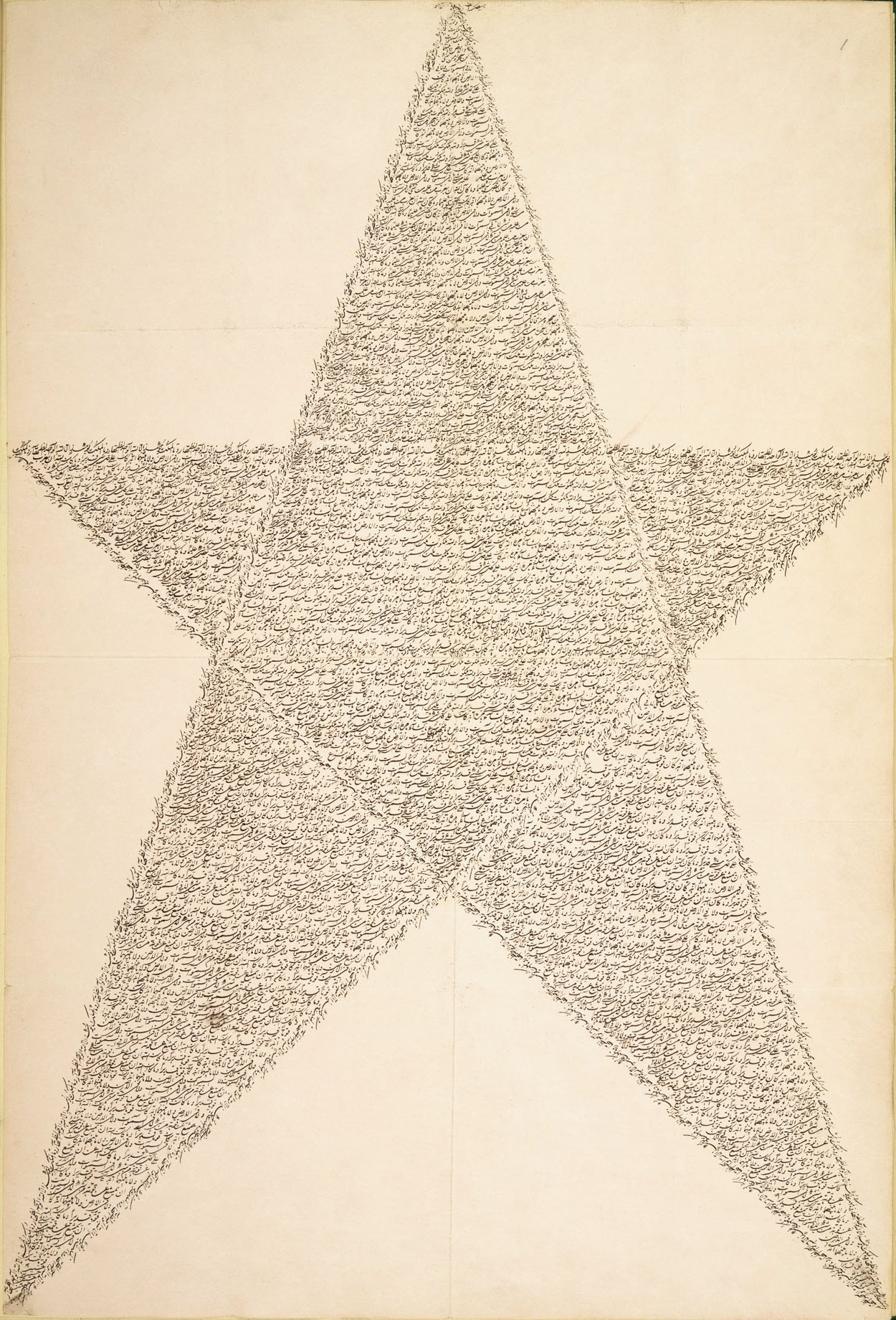
Haykal by the Báb written in his own hand

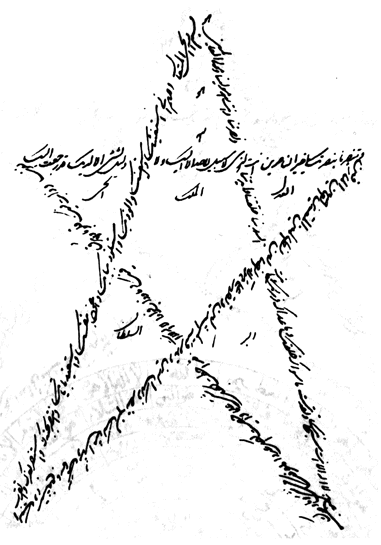
An unidentified tablet in the Báb's handwriting

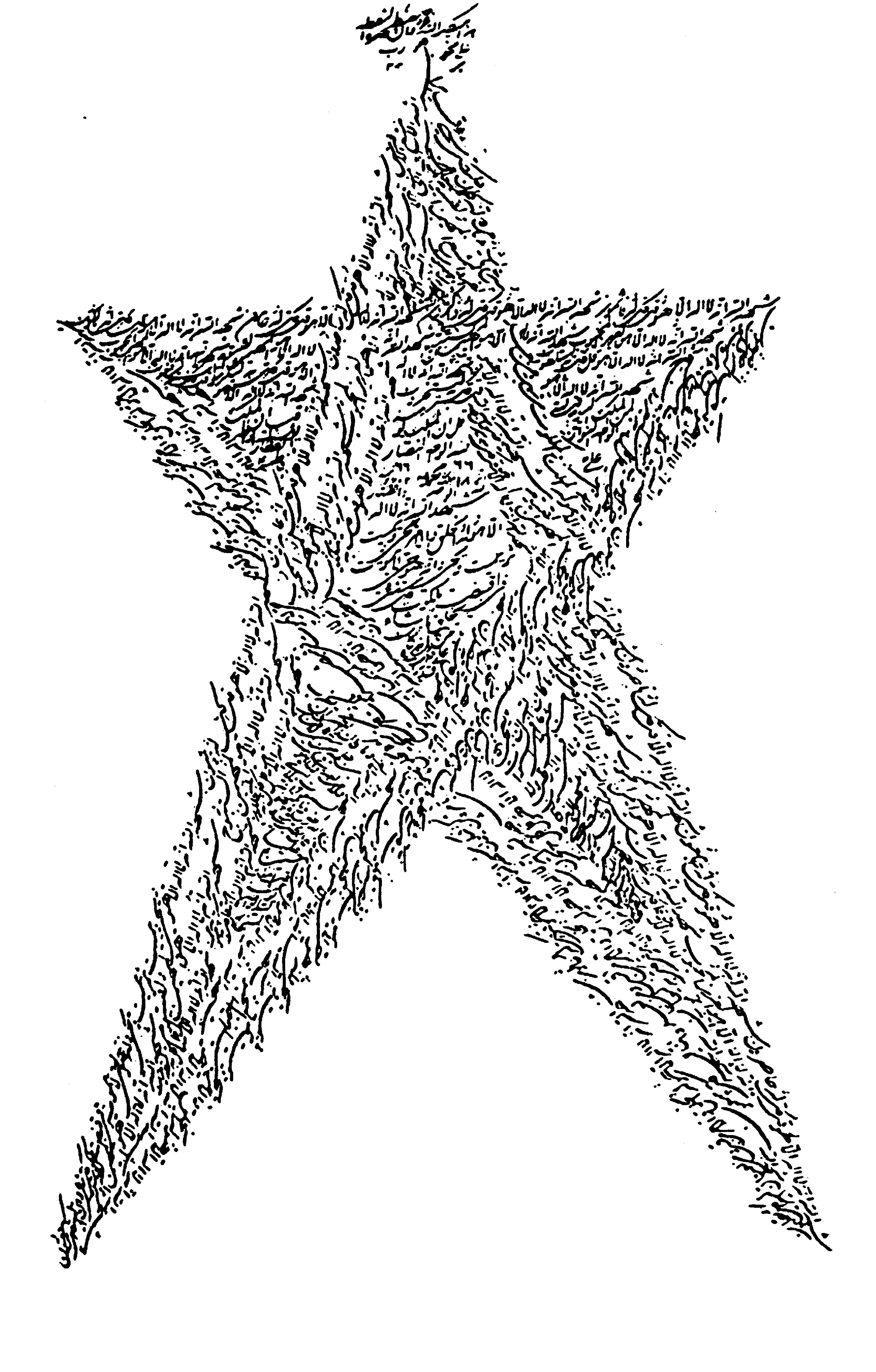
An unidentified tablet in the Báb's handwriting

== The Greatest Name ==
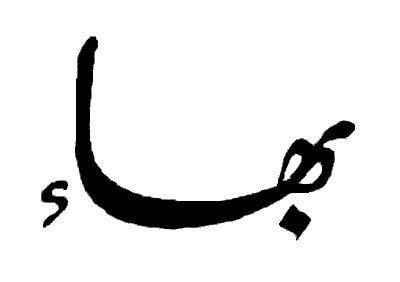
The word Baháʼ

In Islam, God has 99 names, and in some Muslim traditions it is believed that there is a special hidden 100th name, which is the greatest. In the Baháʼí Faith, this 'Greatest Name' is Baháʼ (بهاء), translated as "glory, splendour. Many symbols of the Baháʼí Faith derive their significance from the word Baháʼ. It is the root word used in many other names and phrases including Baháʼí (a follower of Baháʼ), Baháʼu'lláh "Glory of God", ʻAbdu'l-Bahá "Servant of Glory", Yá Baháʼu'l-Abhá "O Thou Glory of the Most Glorious", and Alláh-u-Abhá "God is Most Glorious".

Calligraphy of the Greatest Name

Baháʼu'lláh often referred to Baháʼís in his writings as "the people of Baháʼ". The Báb sent a tablet to Baháʼu'lláh with 360 derivatives of the word Baháʼ. Along with daily prayers, Baháʼís are encouraged to recite the phrase "Alláh-u-Abhá" 95 times in a form of meditation.

Arabic letters in the Greatest Name

The symbol known as Greatest Name is a calligraphic rendering of "Yá Baháʼu'l-Abhá" (Arabic: يا بهاء الأبهى, romanized: Yā bahāʾ al-Abhá, lit. 'most glorious splendour!'), usually translated as "O Thou the Glory of the Most Glorious!"). This rendering was originally drawn by the early Baháʼí calligrapher Mishkín-Qalam, and later adopted by Baháʼís everywhere.

Since the symbol refers more directly to the Name of God and the Manifestation of God than any other symbol in the Baháʼí Faith, it is not generally used casually or to adorn the personal artifacts that are put to common use. The symbol can usually be seen in Baháʼí homes and rings that are produced on a limited scale.

== Ringstone symbol ==
An artistic representation of the Baháʼí Ringstone Symbol

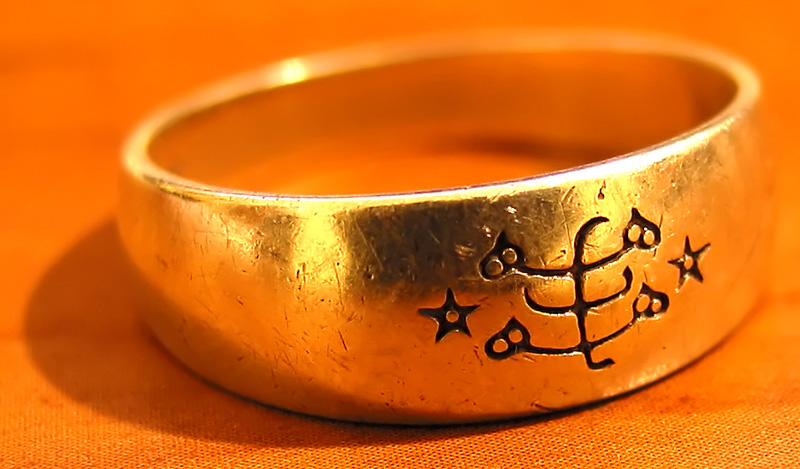
Ringstone Symbol on jewelry

The Ringstone Symbol was designed by ʻAbdu'l-Bahá, and, as its name implies, is the most common symbol found on rings worn by Baháʼís, but it is also used on necklaces, book covers, and paintings. It consists of two stars (haykal) interspersed with a stylized Baháʼ. The lower line is said to represent humanity and the world of creation, the upper line the world of God, and the middle line represents the special station of Manifestation of God and the world of revelation; the vertical line is the primal will or Holy Spirit proceeding from God through the manifestations to humanity. The position of Manifestation of God in this symbol is said to be the linking point to God. The two stars or haykals represent Baháʼu'lláh and the Báb. It is also probably no coincidence that the shape of the symbol bears similarity to the Chinese characters for king 王, Jade Emperor 玉帝, and master 主.
