= Advent of Divine Justice =

1938 letter by Shoghi Effendi

The Advent of Divine Justice is a letter written December 25, 1938, to the Baháʼís of the United States and Canada, by Shoghi Effendi, describing the role of America in establishing the Most Great Peace.

While technically a long-form letter or epistle, The Advent of Divine Justice is commonly published and studied as an independent book.

The book lays out a Baháʼí understanding of the unique spiritual destiny of America and the role that American Baháʼís have in ensuring the country is able to fulfill that destiny. Shoghi Effendi describes the North American Baháʼís as "the spiritual descendants of the Dawn-breakers" and says they will play an important part in establishing the Faith around the world. He states that to contribute fully to this process, American Baháʼís must internalize three spiritual prerequisites: "moral rectitude", "absolute chastity", and "complete freedom from prejudice".

The book repeatedly references the Tablets of the Divine Plan by ʻAbdu'l-Bahá—which gave an early impetus to the spread of the Baháʼí Faith in North America—and Shoghi Effendi devotes more than half of the book to discussing the attitudes to be adopted and techniques to be used by Baháʼís when teaching the religion.
