= Baháʼí studies =

Scholarly study of the Baháʼí Faith

The scholarly study of the Baháʼí Faith, its teachings, history and literature is currently conducted in a variety of venues, including institutes of the Baháʼí administration as well as non-affiliated universities. Some scholars study some aspect of the Baháʼí Faith as part of research on related matters while others engage in Baháʼí studies as a primary focus of their research. Scholars' comments on the religion and its predecessor Bábism date back to at least 1845, the year after its founding. Initially, they were often Orientalists or Christian missionaries but through time both Baháʼís and non-Baháʼí researchers have addressed the religion especially in tune with the growth of the religion, which has been called significant.

== Organizations ==
- Association for Baháʼí Studies − founded in 1975, the ABS operates under the supervision of the National Spiritual Assembly of the Baháʼís of Canada.
- Baháʼí Library Online − a private, independent, all-volunteer project created by Jonah Winters and a team of contributors.
- Baháʼí Reference Library − an agency of the Baháʼí International Community, hosts authorized writings of the religion.
- H-Bahai − part of H-Net, an international interdisciplinary organization of scholars, H-Bahai is a website making available a wealth of difficult-to-obtain primary sources on the religion.
- Irfan Colloquium
- Landegg International University − a now defunct university that operated from 1992 to 2003 under the aegis of the Baháʼí community of Switzerland
- Unity Museum is a boutique tax-exempt non-profit member of the Washington Museum Association and American Alliance of Museums, separate from the formal organizational structure of the Baháʼí Faith, with its own board of directors, in Seattle, Washington, located near the University of Washington.
- Wilmette Institute − founded in 1995 as an educational endeavor of the National Spiritual Assembly of the United States, the Wilmette Institute provides on-line and on-site summer residential sessions.
- Mediathèque Baha'ie Francophone

== Journals ==
- Baháʼí Studies Bulletin, published 1982–1993, Newcastle upon Tyne.
  - Somewhat informal, yet prepared with full scholarly standards, the Baháʼí Studies Bulletin was edited, photocopied and distributed by Stephen Lambden, Professor of Religious Studies at University of Newcastle upon Tyne (said university not itself affiliated with the Bulletin). Contributors were university professors and other scholars, and the early years saw Bulletins that were a mixture of handwritten and typed articles (of varying layouts). Many of the contributors later appeared in the later, "more polished" journals listed here.
- Baháʼí Studies (a French-English bilingual publication, full name on the journal's cover is Études Baháʼí Studies)
  - published 19?? to 1987, in Ottawa, by the Canadian Association for Studies on the Baháʼí Faith
  - the Canadian association, and its journal, changed names in 1988 − see next bullet...
- The Journal of Baháʼí Studies (a French-English-Spanish trilingual publication)
  - published since 1988, in Ottawa, by the Association for Baháʼí Studies (North America), an agency of the National Spiritual Assembly of the Bahá’ís of Canada.
- Baháʼí Journal of the Baháʼí Community of the United Kingdom of Great Britain and Northern Ireland or Baháʼí Journal UK some issues of which were digitized and is preserved online. Then the periodical was redone and called the UK Baha'i Journal.
- Baháʼí Studies Review
- H-Bahai Digital Publications Series − published by H-Bahai, consisting of Occasional Papers in Shaykhi, Babi and Baha'i Studies; Research Notes in Shaykhi, Babi and Baha'i Studies; Documents on the Shaykhi, Babi and Baha'i Movements; and Translations of Shaykhi, Babi and Baha'i Primary Texts
- Irfan Colloquia, consisting of Safini-yi 'Irfán: Papers Presented at the ʻIrfán Colloquia (in Persian); Lights of ʻIrfán: Papers Presented at the ʻIrfán Colloquia and Seminars (in English), and Beiträge des 'Irfán-Kolloquiums: 'Irfán-Studien zum Baháʼí-Schrifttum (in German)
- UK Baha'i Review, various issues of which were digitized and is preserved online
- World Order Magazine (published 1935–1949 and 1966–2002)

== Academic chairs ==
- Baha'i Chair for Studies in Development − at Devi Ahilya Vishwavidyalaya in Indore, Madhya Pradesh, India.
- Baha'i Chair for World Peace − at the University of Maryland, College Park in College Park, Maryland, United States of America.
- Chair in Baháʼí Studies − at the Hebrew University of Jerusalem.
- Lecture Series in Baha'i Studies, Meir & Miriam Ezri Center for Iran and Persian Gulf Studies, University of Haifa

== Archives and collections ==
=== Baháʼí archives/collections ===
A number of collections of Baháʼí related materials are preserved around the world. Some are maintained at universities; the Baháʼí World Center, especially at the Centre for the Study of the Sacred Texts, the International Archives, and International Baháʼí Library, most National Baháʼí Assemblies and many local Baháʼí assemblies or institutions maintain their own archives.

==== Academic ====
- Ghassem Ghani Collection, at Yale University, 1800–1900, 3.5 linear feet (1 box, 2 folios) in Persian.
- Jamshed & Parvati Fozdar Collection at the National Library of Singapore.
- Baron Victor Rosen's collection in the Archive of the Russian Academy of Sciences, St. Petersburg branch.
- Badiʼu'lláh and Muhammad Ali Bahaʼi Papers, 1901–1944, Burke Library Archives, Columbia University Libraries, Union Theological Seminary, New York
- Hurqalya Publications: Center for Shaykhī and Bābī-Bahāʼī Studies by Stephen Lambden, University of California, Merced.

==== Baháʼí sponsored ====
- US National Bahai Archives, for Louhelen Baháʼí School Library, and the National Baha'i Library, US
- Eliot Baha'i Archives associated with Green Acre Baháʼí School
- Los Angeles Baha'i Archives on Facebook, and YouTube.
- Spiritual Assembly of the Baha'is of Washington, D.C. Archives
- Afnan Library, collection is the books, manuscripts and papers left by the late Hasan Balyuzi and others, located in Sandy near Cambridge, United Kingdom.

== Publishing ==
A number of venues exist for publishing materials related to the Baháʼí Faith. Many national assemblies have their own publishing trust and there are a few publishing houses that run more or less independently. Among them are:

- BahaiBookStore.com the Baháʼí Distribution Service acting as an agency of the National Spiritual Assembly of the Baháʼís of the United States
- BahaiBooksUK is the publishing trust of the National Spiritual Assembly of the Baháʼís of the United Kingdom.
- BahaiBooks is the publishing trust of the National Spiritual Assembly of the Baháʼís of Australia, founded in 1976.
- Baha'i Publishing Trust of India.
- Oneworld Publications founded in 1986 in the UK has published Baha'i books.
- Kalimát Press is a small, privately owned Baha'i publishing company.
- Baháʼí Encyclopedia Project was also established by the National Spiritual Assembly of the Baháʼís of the United States for invited scholars to contribute scholarly articles.

== Scholarship ==
Starting in the earliest days of Bábísm, viewed by Baháʼís as the predecessor to their own religion, scholarship on the religion has been produced.

While there were previous Iran or near-Iranian sources of scholarship of the religion in early periods, wide-ranging publications covering mostly western literature include Moojan Momens' 1981 The Babi and Baha'i Religions, 1844–1944: Some Contemporary Western Accounts, William Collins' 1992 Bibliography of English-language works on the Bábí and Baháʼí faiths, 1844–1985, and MacEoin's annotated bibliography borrowing heavily from Collins' work. There is also the Resource Guide for the Scholarly Study of the Baháʼí Faith by Robert Stockman and Jonah Winters published in 1997, focusing more on later works. Mostly these works explicitly ignored newspaper accounts.

=== 19th century ===
A wide variety of accounts, encounters and investigations began to circulate outside of Persia as events began to unfold from the Spring of 1844 with the Declaration of the Báb. Initially viewed as an Iranian development and often through Christian missionary perspectives, the growth of religion would soon far transcend that limited perspective.

- Diplomatic reports on Bábí activities begins January 8, 1845 concerning the fate of Mullá ʿAli-e Bastāmi. These were exchanges between Sir Henry Rawlinson, 1st Baronet who wrote first to Stratford Canning, 1st Viscount Stratford de Redcliffe.
- Newspaper accounts in the West began November 1, 1845, in The Times of London. Followed November 15 by the Literary Gazette which was subsequently echoed widely. This earliest coverage does not mention the Báb − instead it covers an episode related in The Dawn-Breakers, as first noted in a book by Hasan M. Balyuzi. Subsequent newspaper accounts occurred across Europe.
- A number of articles were printed in 1848–9 in Journal de Constantinople in French near the time Battle of Fort Tabarsi. Before that in June 1848 a letter from May 1 was summarized. A series in March 1849 followed, and another appeared separately in April in the Revue de l'Orient. Momen believes this article in Revue de l'Orient to be from Dr. Ernest Cloquet. These accounts name the Báb. Accounts followed in English and French.
- 1850 newspaper accounts mention the Báb having a "holy book", and was followed through the Fall of 1850, and as far as Australia and New Zealand late in the year.
- The first paper on the religion was as a letter dated February 10, 1851 by Dr. Rev. Austin H. Wright to the American Oriental Society, then holding its meetings in Boston and published by the society June 14, 1851, It was also published in a Vermont newspaper June 26, 1851, and in a German newspaper in 1851 translated by his superior, Rev. Justin Perkins. It was also published in a South Carolinian newspaper in June 1865 on the front page.
- In 1852 there was a clumsy fringe attempted assassination of Naser al-Din Shah Qajar. Various aspects of the events that unfolded were reported in newspapers in the West over a period of time and referred to back in time occasionally. Mention occurs in a hard to find very early Persian newspaper, while Western papers begin October 1852. The French Journal des débats politiques et littéraires, 30 October 1852, citing the Journal de Constantinople of 14 Oct had a story mentioning the event. This French entry in late October mentions some 400 Bábís being executed. By December coverage is talking about 20,000 or 30,000 being executed. Comparisons with Emperor Nero and the Great Fire of Rome were made decades later.
- A number of articles report Bábís west of Iran, in "Syria", in June 1853.
- Henry Aaron Stern (1820–1885) wrote a book that mentions "Baba, the Persian socialist" for a couple pages in 1854.
- Glimpses of Life and Manners in Modern Persia was published in London in 1856 by Mary Sheil and Sir Justin Sheil and on pp. 176–81, 273-82 made mention of events in 1849–1852.
- De:Julius Heinrich Petermann was in Baghdad 1854–55 and was a professor of oriental literature in Berlin. In 1861 his work Reisen im Orient published an article "Achtzehntes Kapital/Aufenthalt in Bagdad" − which mentions Bábís briefly in one paragraph.
- In 1865 the Dr. Jakob Eduard Polak published his first hand account of the attempted assassination of Shah in Das Land und seine Bewohner. It includes a significant witnessing of the death of Tahirih. In 1865 two more significant works are produced. First, Frenchman Arthur de Gobineau wrote the first widely published and relatively extensive history of the religion. A third edition was printed in 1900 covering approximate pages 141-358 (217 pages) on the Bábí Faith. It was the basis of much follow-up interest and accounts followed by others. The work, while not very good did serve to get other scholars to follow along in their interests. The second was by Alexander Kasimovich Kazembek who published the first book as such under the pseudonym "Mirza Kazem-Beg" albeit in Russian. He joined the American Oriental Society (see above) in 1851. In 1866 a version of his work was then published in French by him − Bab et les Babis − as 219 pages across several editions of the Journal Asiatique. Abbas Amanat notes a correction of Kazembek attempt at a biographical workup of the Báb Additionally the 1865 edition of the American Annual Cyclopedia had an entry on "Persia" and on p. 696 includes a paragraph on Bábís. And Adolphe Franck wrote two papers in French printed in back to back issues of Journal des Savants − Nov and Dec 1865 − which reviewed Gobineau's works on "Babysm". Lastly, John Ussher published a memoir in 1865 based on notes of his travels in 1861 named A Journey from London to Persepolis with a few pages mentioning Bábí/Baháʼí events.
- In 1866 British diplomat Robert Grant Watson published a history of the first 58 years of the 19th century of Persia and included 16 pages on Bábí/Baháʼí events. Frenchman Ernst Renan wrote The Origins of Christianity: The apostles in 1866 of which pages 299–301, 353 examines the Bábís through Gobineau and Kazembek and an attempt a first hand contact in Constantiniople. The Nation published an article "A New Religion" in June. It starts by mention of Renan's work and then focuses on Gobineau's account. A review of Gobineau in The Methodist Quarterly Review was published in July.
- William Hepworth Dixon published a travel book with a history with commentary which mentions the Báb and "Babees" on several pages in 1867. Adolphe Franck wrote Philosophie et Religion in 1867, a chapter of which − chapter vi, "Une Nouvelle Religion en Perse" − significantly reviews "Babysm", mostly based on Gobineau. Oriental Mysticism, by Edward Henry Palmer, mentioned the Báb in a footnote on page 44, following Kazembek.
- In 1868 "'Le Babysme'" by Michel Nicolas in Le Temps Other mentions that year include "BABYSME" in l'Annuaire encyclopédique of some 15 pages by "Al Bonneau", and in the Universal History of Catholicism an article on Islam mentions Bábís.
- In 1869 Stephen Greenleaf Bulfinch published followed the work of Renan. Then Edward Payson Evans wrote "Bab and Babism" for the magazine Hours at Home Then Rev. Edwin Bliss wrote "Bab and Babism" in the Missionary Herald. Leo de Colange's 1869 Zell's Popular Encyclopedia included a 2-page entry on the religion named "Babism". It was published in the June 23 Daily Evening Telegraph, of Philadelphia, p. 6 Another repeat appeared July 17 in Green Bay, Wisconsin. "A New Religion" was published in All the Year Round, anonymously, which was echoed in the Brooklyn Eagle, August 3, 1869, page 1. The Hawaiian Gazette, Honolulu Oahu, Hawaii, Sept 8, 1869, p. 4, had a 3 paragraph summary on the religion. Robert Arbuthnot wrote an article for the Contemporary Review. Meanwhile, Annee Philosophique − Études Critiques Sur Le Mouvement Des Idées Génénerales, published in 1869, by F. Pillon (other parts by Ch. Renouvier) included "Une Nouvelle Religion en Asia" across 35 pages. The Saturday Review of Politics, Literature, Science and Art, August 21, 1869, carried a story "Reviews: The Philosophical Year and the Bábys" looks at another journal, M. F. Pillon's Philosophical Annual.
- In about 1870 Michele Lessona wrote a book I Babi which was published in 1881 by Vincenzo Bona in Turin, Italy. Lessona had been a physician serving in Persia circa 1862 for a number of years where he learned of the Babis from a "Dávud Khán" as well as Gobineau. Polish writer pl:Aleksander Walerian Jablonowski had met Baháʼís in Baghdad. Later in the 1870s he wrote several articles covering its early history in Persia − one of these was to defend the Baháʼí Faith against an erroneous article in another publication.
- In the rest of the 1870s more scattered mentions are made. In 1871 Thomas Chaplin intended to visit Baháʼu'lláh and had a couple-hour interview with ʻAbdu'l-Bahá and sent a letter to the editor printed in The Times. Momen comments this seems to be the first extended commentary on Baháʼu'lláh in western newspapers. In 1872 "The Bâbys", The Church Missionary Intelligencer was published anonymously. Augustus Henry Mounsey published A journey through the Caucasus and the interior of Persia which reviews events related to the Báb and Bábís. In 1873 a couple of Christian missionary journals printed articles:The Colonial Church chronicle, and missionary journal and Sunday at Home. A General Sketch of the History of Persia by Clements Markham mentioned Bábí events in 1874. A Babism entry was in The World's Progress; a Dictionary of Dates. The Dublin University Magazine, March 1878, noted of Bábí events contextualizing work by Percy Bysshe Shelley.
- Comparative sparse mentions continued in the 1880s though for the first time there is an academic conference called. First Adolfo Rivadeneyra traveled through Persia and in 1880 and published Viaje al Interior de Persia Then on 5 and 12 December 1880 two conferences on the Bábí movement were given in Torino Italy by Michele Lessona. Carla Serena traveled in Persia in 1877–78. She published several books and the one was Hommes et Choses en Perse which was published in 1883. An article "Babysm" was then published in the Oxford National Encyclopedia for 1884. Mary F Wilson (Jan 12, 1861 − June 1895?) wrote a 21-page article "Story of the Bab" which was published in several magazines − Contemporary Review, Dec 1885, and repeated in Littell's Living Age, The Library Magazine, and Eclectic Magazine. Echoes and summaries were also printed in Australia, and other places. "Woman in the Ministry: An Appeal to Fact", by John Tunis, was published in Unity, May 9, 1885. Persia: the land of the imams. A narrative of travel and residence, 1871–1885, published 1886, by American Presbyterian missionary James Bassett which was also reviewed in The New York Times, 9 May 1886 and The Inter Ocean in Chicago, Illinois. Samuel Greene Wheeler Benjamin published Persia and the Persians in 1886 in America after being stationed in Persia from 1882 representing the US government. It was reprinted in London in 1887. Reviews were published in various newspapers. Jane Dieulafoy traveled in Persia with her husband in 1880–81 and publishes an account visiting Baháʼís in 1887. A New English Dictionary on Historical Principles has an article where "Babism" as here is the second definition. "The Babis of Persia" was published the Journal of the Royal Asiatic Society, July − Oct, 1889. The first entry by The Encyclopædia Britannica on Babi/Baha'i history occurred in 1889 which was repeated into 1893 and appears to be identical to the one in 1902.
- Mentions begin to become more common in the 1890s. The first was by Robert Bruce called "News of the Month: In a Letter from Dr. Bruce of Persia…" by The Jewish Intelligence in August 1890. A "Babism" entry in Blackie's modern cyclopedia of universal information also appeared that year. However the main development was the interest of Edward Granville Browne who investigated the Babis in Persia and then the prisoners sent west and began to publish about 1891 many times ultimately through about the 1920s. Among these were A Traveller's Narrative: Written to illustrate the episode of the Bab (1891), A Year Among the Persians (1893). Newspapers and magazines began to widely cover his work.
- But other writers still were independently addressing Bábí and Baháʼí history as well. Isabella Bird briefly describes Bábís being attacked and taking refuge in a book Journeys in Persia and Kurdistan printed in 1891, and Theodore Bent published "Village life in Persia" in Review.
- Thomas Henry Huxley mentions Bábism in Essays upon some Controverted Questions in 1892. George Curzon, 1st Marquess Curzon of Kedleston in his Persia and the Persian Question comments on Bábí-"Behai" presence in Persia. A posthumous work of George Thomas Bettany was published in 1892. It includes alittle more than a page on "Babism". Anonymously "The Bab" was published in The Oxford Magazine 1892, and a "Catalogue and Descriptions of 27 Bábí Manuscripts" was published in the Journal of the Royal Asiatic Society, July 1892. Baron Roman Rosen published some articles based on his collection of materials first in "Some Remarks on the Bábí Texts Edited by Baron Victor Rosen" in the Journal of the Royal Asiatic Society, 1892. This article was also reviewed in The New York Times, 5 June 1892, which names the author as Coutts Trotter.
- In 1893 Rev. Henry Harris Jessup delivered a talk at the Chicago Parliament of the World's Religions held at World's Columbian Exposition and quoted Browne's meeting with Baháʼu'lláh. The Inter Ocean also published a survey of presentations at the Parliament with Rev. Jessup's presentation is included. A few notable Baháʼís are noted to have been present for or heard of the presentation: Sarah Farmer (see Green Acre Baháʼí School) and Thornton Chase. The Right Rev Charles Stileman, Anglican clergyman, also published an article in 1893. Meanwhile, the first Baháʼí to enter the United States was briefly noted in the New York Tribune. According to Stockman he is the US in the summer of 1892.
- Some newspapers lead of coverage of the Faith in 1894 start noting persecution of "Bahis". An account of Frederic John Goldsmid reading at the Missionary conference of the Anglican Communion in the UK including quoting a translation by Browne from "Behá" was published in the Guardian. "The Babis of Persia" article by M. Y. De Goeze, in The Missionary Review of the World followed. "The Babis of Persia" by Rev P Z Easton, in The Missionary Review of the World appeared in the summer of 1894 along with "Wahabiism and Babism − Bibliography" in July. A brief summary in the Sacramento Daily Union of religion in Persia mentions the Babis and the punishment they suffer under no protection of rank or standing. JH Shedd also published "Babism: Its Doctrine and Relation to Mission Work" late in 1894.
- James Strong, of Concordance fame, had been continuing work on a Cyclopedia begun in 1853. The 1895 edition of Vol 1 had an entry on "Babist". Henry Edward Plantagenet wrote a brief piece of his encounter with Baháʼí's in Haifa in the article "'Babism' in a UK journal The Academy. Rev Samuel Graham Wilson mentioned the Bab and Babis on a few pages in his Persian life and customs in 1895. A more general review but with more modern terminology appeared in the Delphos Daily Herald in Ohio. This was followed in 1896 in the October edition of The Missionary Review of the World in "The Gospel Work in Persia". Scotsman Thomas Edward Gordon published Persia Revisited which mentions the Bab and Bábís.
- The pace of scholarly work expanded in 1896 with several further writers; Lepel Griffin, Friedrich Carl Andreas, J. D. Rees, Gaston Dujarric, Canon Edward Sell, Hugh Reginald Haweis, The last was also summarized in a newspaper account 16 December 1896 in the Indiana Democrat.
- Reverend James Thompson Bixby wrote a number of articles related to the Faith with the first being "Babism and the Bab" in the New World, December 1897, Charles William Heckethorn, and Áqá ʻAbdu'l-Ahad Zanjání wrote in "Personal Reminiscences of the Bábí Insurrection at Zanjân in 1850" for the Journal of the Royal Asiatic Society. Then "Some Notes on the Literature and Doctrines of the Hurufi Sect" mentioned Bábísm. entry "Báb-ed-Din" in a dictionary closes out 1898.

=== 20th century ===
- 1900 Opens with Russian scholar H. Arakelian from his 1900 paper/lecture in French, "Le Bêbisme en Perse", at the September 5, 1900 meeting of the "International Congress of the History of Religions" held in Paris.
- 1901 Has Edward Denison Ross writing an article for The North American Review called "Babism". It appeared again in 1912 in Great Religions of the World in 1912 with a preface about ʻAbdu'l-Bahá's travels.
- A.L.M. Nicholas, noted as "No European scholar has contributed so much to our knowledge of the life and teaching of the Báb as Nicolas. His study of the life of the Báb and his translations of several of the most important books of the Báb remain of unsurpassed value."
- Stoyan Krystoff Vatralsky made some news circa 1899/1900 and wrote a paper in 1902 in the American Journal of Theology. Baha'is have reviewed his work.
- "The Missionary Outlook" by Rev. Courtenay H. Penn, followed in The Missionary Review August 1902
- "Babism and the Babites", by Rev. Henry Harris Jessup was published in The Missionary Review October.
- "A visit to the Prophet of Persia" by Philip Sidersky and Rev. S.K. Braun was published in The Missionary Review also in October.
- In 1904 in Missions and Modern History: a study of the missionary aspects of some great movements of the nineteenth century, by Presbyterian minister Robert Elliott Speer was published. Another couple articles totaling 139 pages by Dr. Paul Carus came out in the summer in the journal Open Court, (and also had an advertisement by Kheiralla and MacNutt.) There is a reply in the January 1905 edition of Open Court led by Carus' commentary adjusting some details and then publishing the rebuttal by Arthur Dodge. An anonymous reprise and summary called "American; Babism in New York" followed in The Missionary Review in May 1906. A. V. Williams Jackson then published Persia, Past and Present which has a couple pages on the Bábí/Baháʼí Faiths including brief mention of "Behaists" near Chicago. Across Persia was then published in 1907 by Eliot Crawshay-Williams who travelled Persia in 1903 − chapter XX is about Bábí-Baháʼí history. "Babism" had a section in the Orpheus: A General History of Religions, by Salomon Reinach in 1909.
- As early as 1909, but more often since 1911, a column named "The Awaking of the Older Nations", by William T. Ellis, copyrighted to Joseph B. Bowles, began to appear in several newspapers. Ellis was a secular journalist who investigated missionary activity of Christians around the world. Some of the articles of the series covered the Baháʼí Faith. He appears to have encountered the religion in 1910 while ʻAbdu'l-Bahá was in Egypt and his interview was reported in Star of the West, (then called Baháʼí News,) of January 1911. The series mention of the religion runs into 1912. The article often included a picture of some kind. He reports visiting ʻAbdu'l-Bahá's home in Haifa and not seeing Him there − that He was away. He went to Alexandria to catch ʻAbdu'l-Bahá there and refers to an Englishman serving as translator for the interview − this was Sydney Sprague (who mentioned Mary Hanford Ford's "The Oriental Rose" as well.) There is a considerable discussion of the teachings but with various errors as well.
- The February 1910 edition of Twentieth Century Magazine had an article by Baháʼí Helen Campbell profiling the social and economic views of the religion. The New Schaff-Herzog Encyclopedia of Religious Knowledge has entries on Babism and Behaism by associate editor of the encyclopedia, George W. Gilmore, with nothing newer than 1906 in the bibliography. The second, "Behaism", was by Margaret Bloodgood Peeke, "Inspectress-General of the Martinist Order of America" with nothing newer than 1906 in the bibliography. Peeke had gone on to visit ʻAbdu'l-Bahá as a non-Baháʼí in 1899 and judged it to be "living the life" of the teachings of Jesus Christ.
- In early 1911 unitarian minister Celia Parker Woolley advertised a meeting discussing the religion in the African newspaper The Chicago Defender. In late 1911 Ethel Stefana Stevens published two articles in widely circulated magazines − Forthnightly Review, and Everybody's Magazine. a variety of 1911 mentions occur in newspapers − Ghodsea Ashrof emigratig, conditions in Iran, and specifically women's rights, Behaists/"TruthKnowers", a large article about the coming of ʻAbdul'-Bahá to the West of his presence in Europe. Rev. Peter Z. Easton, a Presbyterian in the Synod of the Northeast in New York who was stationed in Tabriz, Iran from 1873 to 1880, did not have an appointment to meet ʻAbdu'l-Bahá in Bristol, UK. Easton attempted to meet and challenge ʻAbdu'l-Bahá and in his actions made those around him uncomfortable; ʻAbdu'l-Bahá withdrew him to a private conversation and then he left. Later he printed a polemic attack on the religion, Bahaism — A Warning, in the Evangelical Christendom newspaper of London. and echoed. The polemic was later responded to by Mírzá Abu'l-Faḍl in his book The Brilliant Proof written in December 1911.
- 1912 − A significant number of articles reviewed or mention ʻAbdu'l-Bahá's journeys to the West; see that article for significant mentions and reviews. However, separately, some mention the Faith of Abdu'l-Bahá before he came to the US such as by Gertrude Atherton or a few mentions were made aside from coverage about ʻAbdu'l-Bahá. Lua Getsinger gave a talk on the religion that was noted in The Pacific Unitarian. Tahirih was noted more than once. The "Clio Information Club" hosted a talk by Howard MacNutt gave a talk in October as noted in the African American New York Age. The first mention of the religion so far found in the Pittsburgh Courier occur when a "Mrs. Davis" held a meeting at her home for a club and the topic was the religion. And there was mention in Australia.
- In 1913 Persia, the Land of the Magi... was published by Samuel Kasha Nweeya. Also in 1913 the article "Key to the Heaven of the Beyan or a Third Call of Attention to the Behaists or Babists of America" was published by August J. Stenstrand for the Illinois State Historical Society.
- In the July 1914 edition of The Harvard Theological Review then Reverend Albert R. Vail published an article surveying the religion. Part 1 of "Bahaism and the Woman Question", by Rev. Samuel G. Wilson, in October Missionary Review of the World. and was followed by part 2 in December. See Baháʼí Faith and gender equality.
- In 1915 Robert P. Richardson published his first article in the Open Court. In 1916 Mary Bird mentioned the religion in a missionary light. In 1917 Albert Vail, along with his wife Emily McClellan Vail, published a two volume set of books each with a chapter about the religion: "Heroic lives" for sixth grade curriculums with student and teacher notebooks.
- ʻAbdu'l-Bahá died in 1921 and was a major event in the region with thousands attending the procession of the casket, and prominent local representatives of Muslim, Christian, and Jewish communities speaking on the occasion. Obituaries appeared in the New York, Los Angeles and elsewhere, based out of reports announced in London news.
- In 1924, American Ambassador to the Qajar dynasty of Persia, Robert Imbrie was killed on suspicion of being a Baháʼí.
- Juan Cole − historian, Richard P. Mitchell Collegiate Professor of History at the University of Michigan.
- Denis MacEoin − historian, Senior Fellow at the Gatestone Institute and a Fellow at the Middle East Forum.
- William McElwee Miller − missionary, Christian minister, and translator.
- Suheil Bushrui was a professor, author, poet, critic, translator, and peace maker as a prominent scholar in regard to the life and works of Kahlil Gibran, published more than one volume about him, and served as the Kahlil Gibran Chair for Values and Peace at the University of Maryland and winner of the Juliet Hollister Awards from the Temple of Understanding.

=== 21st century ===
- Margit Warburg published a book on the history of the Baháʼís focusing on the Danish Baháʼí community in 2006.
- Leigh Eric Schmidt devoted a chapter of his Restless Souls: The Making of American Spirituality published by the University of California Press on the history and impact of Green Acre Baháʼí School.
- The peer-reviewed Journal of Religious History issued a special edition devoted to the Baháʼí Faith in December 2012.
- Abbas Amanat − historian, Professor of History & International Studies at Yale University.
- Moojan Momen − historian, author of numerous books and articles about the Bahaʼi Faith.
- Peter Smith − historian, currently on faculty at Mahidol University International College in Thailand.
- Moshe Sharon − historian, Professor Emeritus of Islamic and Middle Eastern Studies at the Hebrew University of Jerusalem where he serves as Chair in Baháʼí Studies.
- Ehsan Yarshater − Persianist, Hagop Kevorkian Professor Emeritus of Iranian Studies at Columbia University.

== See also ==
- Baháʼí review
- ʻAbdu'l-Hamíd Ishráq-Khávari
- Mírzá Abu'l-Faḍl
- Mírzá Asadu'llah Fádil Mázandarání
- Adib Taherzadeh
