= Peter Smith (historian) =

British historian

Peter Smith is a British historian who helped establish Mahidol University International College (MUIC) in 1987, where he served as university administrator and chair of the Social Science Division until his retirement in 2013. He also teaches courses at the Wilmette Institute, an online Baháʼí educational institution, and is an author of several books specializing in Baháʼí studies.

== Career ==
Smith earned a Certificate of Education, with distinction in Geography, from the University of Bristol, in 1972, followed by a B.Ed. in Geography with honors from the University of Bristol, England in 1973, and then a Ph.D. from the University of Lancaster, England, in the Sociology of Religion in 1983, with his dissertation later published as The Babi and Bahaʼi Religions: From Messianic Shiʻism to a World Religion. Along the way Smith convened four Bahá'í Studies Seminars while at the University of Lancaster - 1977, 1978, 1979 and 1980 - and gave a paper at an August 1983 conference on Bahá'í history at UCLA sponsored by the Spiritual Assembly of Los Angeles and the Bahá'í Club, and two at a Labor Day Los Angeles conference in 1984 on Bahá'í history discussing the development of the religion in the West and liberal and fundamentalist attitudes in religions.

In 1985 he arrived in Thailand for a faculty lecturer position in Religious Studies in the Department of Humanities Social Science division for the Mahidol University International College. He was then a founding member of International Students Degree Program in 1986 and was appointed Division Chairman and Program Director of the Social Science Division in 1998. From 1999 to 2003 Smith was Deputy Director for Academic Affairs, coordinating and overseeing the quality of academic programs and developed a teaching guide for staff. Smith led a unit of five faculty and four degree majors for a Social Science conference in 2003 to promote dialogue and cooperation between Malaysia and Thailand. In 2007 he addressed the Third International Malaysia-Thailand Conference on Southeast Asian Studies, sponsored by the Faculty of Social Sciences and Humanities, University Kebangsaan Malaysia (UKM) and the Social Science Division of MUIC. In May 2011 Smith was conference chair for the University conference on Excellence and the Liberal Arts Tradition, and gave the welcome and chaired a panel at the February 2012 conference of the university Re-Making Historical Memory in Southeast Asia, the 5th Thai-Malaysian International Conference on Southeast Asian Studies. In 2013 Smith was Chair of the Social Science Division but was suddenly past the age of retirement and offered to resign after being the longest serving fulltime faculty of MUIC (and was then Chair of the Social Science Division of MUIC).

=== Professional commentary ===
In 1993 Smith was awarded Commander of the Most Noble Order of the Crown of Thailand, Third Class, and in 2006 received a certificate of merit, citing his 20-year contribution to MUIC, by Dean Chariya Brockelman. During his tenure he developed the Social Science major with concentrations in Southeast Asian Studies, International Studies, and Modern World History, and minors in related fields, as well as new courses. He was called one of the pillars of the college in 2019.

While most of his professional life was an academic in Thailand, most of the published commentary has been about his Bahá'í scholarship. In 2001, oriental studies scholar Juan Cole wrote that "remarkably few social scientists have studied the Bahá'í faith in the United States", and that Peter Smith, along with Peter L. Berger, Jane Wyman, and Margit Warburg have "made important contributions to the social scientific study of this New Religious Movement of Iranian provenance, but they are a small cohort". On the Bahá'í scholarship of Smith, Denis MacEoin, a former Baháʼí, wrote that "Smith has never been a dissident of any kind... He does not take on any of the thorny areas that Warburg or other non-affiliates might tackle. But he does not just parrot official hand-me-downs either, and he remains largely honest to his academic calling."

== Personal life ==
Born in Yorkshire, UK, Smith was raised in Bristol, England, where he joined the Baháʼí Faith at the age of 16 years, initially hearing about the religion from media coverage of the first Baháʼí World Congress held in London. In 1968, after the Palermo Conference held to commemorate the exile of Baháʼu'lláh, the founder of the religion, to Acre, Smith, along with Denis MacEoin, Moojan Momen, and Tahir Ronald Taherzadeh (a son of Adib Taherzadeh), served as one of the youth guides at the mass pilgrimage to the Baháʼí World Centre. Smith then spent a year in Africa and visited some Malawi Bahá'í communities and then went through Botswana. Smith was part of the first Spiritual Assembly of Lancaster which formed in 1976, and served on National Teaching Committees as well as the Local Spiritual Assemblies of Bristol and Durham before leaving the UK.

He is married to Sammi Anvar with whom he has two children.

== Bibliography ==
- Smith, Peter; Collins, William P. (October 2011). Catherine Wessinger (ed.). Babi and Baha'i Millennialism. The Oxford Handbook of Millennialism. Oxford University Press. doi:10.1093/oxfordhb/9780195301052.003.0024.
- Smith, Peter (August 2011). The Universal House of Justice and the Baha'i World: 1963-1973 (PDF). Baha'i Library Online.
- Smith, Peter (2008). An Introduction to the Baha'i Faith. New York: Cambridge University Press. ISBN 978-0-521-68107-0.
- Smith, Peter, ed. (2004). "Bahaʼis in the West". Studies in the Babi and Bahaʼi Religions. 14. Los Angeles: Kalimat Press.
- Smith, Peter (2000). A Concise Encyclopedia of the Baháʼí Faith. Oxford, UK: Oneworld Publications. ISBN 1-85168-184-1.
- Smith, Peter (1999). The Baháʼí Faith: A Short History. Oxford, UK: Oneworld Publications. ISBN 1-85168-208-2.
- Smith, Peter (1988). The Baháʼí Religion, A Short Introduction to its History and Teachings. Oxford, UK: George Ronald. ISBN 0-85398-277-5.
- Smith, Peter (1987). The Bábí and Baháʼí Religions: From Messianic Shiʻism to a World Religion. Cambridge, UK: Cambridge University Press. ISBN 0-521-30128-9.
- Smith, Peter, ed. (1986). In Iran: Studies in Babi and Bahaʼi History. Vol. 3. Los Angeles: Kalimat Press.
