= Baháʼí review =

Baháʼí review is a requirement within the Baháʼí Faith that members must secure the permission of a review committee of their respective National Spiritual Assembly before publishing material on the religion. The requirement was initiated by ʻAbdu'l-Bahá as a temporary measure while the religion was obscure.

The stated intention of pre-publication review is, "to protect the Faith against misrepresentation by its own followers at this early stage of its existence when comparatively few people have any knowledge of it", according to the Universal House of Justice, the governing body of the Baháʼís. Review typically entails verification of quotations from the Baháʼí writings to maintain accuracy and dignity, as well as a review of timeliness. The review does not consider literary merit or its value as a publication, and is not required for doctoral theses or informal online material, such as blogs.

The review created tension with a few Baháʼí authors, notably Juan Cole and Denis MacEoin, who left the religion in part over disagreements with reviewers. Disregard for the review process can incur, among other things, the loss of good standing for Baháʼí authors.

== Historical basis ==
The origin of the requirement for review comes from ʻAbdu'l-Bahá. He is quoted here by Shoghi Effendi in 1922:

His honour, Sheikh Faraju'llah, has here rendered into Arabic with greatest care the Ishraqat and yet I have told him that he must submit his version to the Spiritual Assembly of Egypt, and I have conditioned its publication upon the approval of the above-named Assembly. This is so that things may be arranged in an orderly manner, for should it not be so any one may translate a certain Tablet and print and circulate it on his own account. Even a non-believer might undertake such work, and thus cause confusion and disorder. If it be conditioned, however, upon the approval of the Spiritual Assembly, a translation prepared, printed and circulated by a non-believer will have no recognition whatever.

Shoghi Effendi further commented on the above:

This is indeed a clear indication of [ʻAbdu'l-Bahá's] express desire that nothing whatever should be given to the public by any individual among the friends, unless fully considered and approved by the Spiritual Assembly in his locality; and if this (as is undoubtedly the case) is a matter that pertains to the general interest of the Cause in that land, then it is incumbent upon the Spiritual Assembly to submit it to the consideration and approval of the national body representing all the various local assemblies. Not only with regard to publication, but all matters without any exception whatsoever, regarding the interests of the Cause in that locality, individually or collectively, should be referred exclusively to the Spiritual Assembly in that locality, which shall decide upon it, unless it be a matter of national interest, in which case it shall be referred to the national body. With this national body also will rest the decision whether a given question is of local or national interest.

Shoghi Effendi, with the above statement in mind, stated that due to the infancy of the Baháʼí Faith, the accuracy of information presented about it needed to be verified since an inaccurate statement could cause much harm to it. Shoghi Effendi wrote in March 1923:

[members of every Spiritual Assembly] must supervise, in these days when the Cause is still in its infancy, all Baháʼí publications and translations, and provide in general for a dignified and accurate presentation of all Baháʼí literature and its distribution to the general public.

== Purpose ==
The review has three stated goals:

- To ensure the accuracy of the presentation of the teachings of the Faith

The function of reviewing is, essentially, to check the Author's exposition of the Baháʼí Faith and its teachings, which may include verification of any quotations from Baháʼí writings. This function should not be confused with evaluation of the literary merit of a work or of its value as a publication, which are normally the prerogative of the publisher...

— Universal House of Justice,

- To protect the faith from misrepresentation by its own followers:

The purpose of review is to protect the Faith against misrepresentation by its own followers at this early stage of its existence when comparatively few people have any knowledge of it. An erroneous presentation of the Teachings by a Baháʼí who is accounted a scholar, in a scholarly journal, would by that very fact, do far more harm than an erroneous presentation made by an obscure Baháʼí author with no pretensions to scholarship.

— Universal House of Justice,

- To ensure dignity of the form

It is an obligation of all Baháʼís to present the faith in a dignified manner and therefore when writing articles about the Faith they should take into consideration the type of magazine or other publication in which the article is to appear. Should there be any question about its character they should consult with the National Spiritual Assembly. In addition, all authors should bear in mind that anything written about the Faith for publication is subject to review before submission to the publishers.

— Universal House of Justice,

The review committee is recommended to be small, composed of two or three Baháʼís with an adequate education and knowledge of the Baháʼí Faith. They do not evaluate the literary merit of the work which is the prerogative of the publisher.

== Cessation ==
Baháʼí institutions have signalled their intention to continue the requirement, although it is to be removed at some point in the future; they state that even though the Baháʼí Faith is no longer an obscure religion, the large majority of people do not know of its existence, and that most of its adherents are relatively new Baháʼís. Because of these two things, and that the Baháʼí Faith can no longer be protected by obscurity, it becomes more important to present a correct view early on. A guideline for Local Spiritual Assemblies produced by an office of the National Spiritual Assembly of the Baháʼís of the United States wrote in 1998,

The Faith is as yet in its infancy. Despite its emergence from obscurity, even now the vast majority of the human race remains ignorant of its existence; moreover, the vast majority of its adherents are relatively new Baháʼís. The change implied by this new stage in its evolution is that whereas heretofore this tender plant was protected in its obscurity from the attention of external elements, it has now become exposed. This exposure invites close observation, and that observation will eventually lead to opposition in various quarters. So, far from adopting a carefree attitude, the community must be conscious of the necessity to present a correct view of itself and an accurate understanding of its purpose to a largely skeptical public. A greater effort, a greater care must now be exercised to ensure its protection against the malice of the ignorant and the unwisdom of its friends.

== Criticism and commentary ==
=== Juan Cole ===
Former Baháʼí historian Juan Cole wrote in 1998:

The Baháʼí faith imposes a system of in-house censorship on all Baháʼís [...] just as most Middle Eastern governments have practiced censorship since the rise of printing in the nineteenth century. Within the Baháʼí religion, any piece of writing by a Baháʼí author about the religion intended for publication is to be vetted by elected Baháʼí officials at the appropriate level (local, national, international). This requirement has provoked many conflicts between Baháʼí officials and writers over the years.

=== Denis MacEoin ===
Denis MacEoin was a Baháʼí for 15 years, from 1965 to 1980. He did his doctoral dissertation on the Babi movement at Cambridge in 1979. In the late 1970s, he submitted material for a Baháʼí review process, and his manuscript was rejected. He resigned from the Bahá'í faith and later published the material with E.J. Brill as The Sources for Early Bābī Doctrine and History. He went on to write very critically of the review process.

The tendency is to describe alternative versions as 'distortions' or 'doubtful judgements' which have to be 'corrected' by reference to a body of 'facts' contained in the standard histories... the Baha'i authorities are eager to promote only a limited type of scholarship that accepts for its basic premise the underlying validity of divine revelation as expressed in the Baha'i scriptures... Those responsible for carrying out the review of publishable material are not normally trained academics, but are usually drawn from the ranks of `knowledgeable' and experienced Baha'is deemed capable of ensuring that a given text conform to accepted standards in terms of both style and content.

In response to accusations by Denis MacEoin of censorship, Baháʼí author Moojan Momen wrote:

I have ‘censored’ nothing. Then MacEoin has quoted selectively from Shoghi Effendi and the Universal House of Justice to make the Baha’i Faith appear intolerant and antiintellectual. If I had the space, I could equally present a range of quotations that would make them appear the acme of liberalism and modernity. The fact is that the Baha’i Faith is a much more varied landscape than the stark picture MacEoin draws... there is no more ‘censorship’ involved in this process [at the Baha’i Studies Review] than with any other academic journal.

=== Others ===
Barney Leith wrote in 1995: "I submit that it is no longer possible or right for National Assemblies to try to control the kinds of things Bahá'ís publish about their Faith."

Former Baháʼí, William Garlington, wrote in 2005:

Review has become especially problematic because it constitutes a third-party intervention between the author and the publisher, a process most publishing houses are not willing to accept. Within the Baha'i review process itself, problems arise when the reviewers are not knowledgeable enough about the material to make reasonable judgments or they exceed their boundaries and begin to make editorial evaluations about the suitability of the work for publication.

Margit Warburg, a sociologist who published a detailed study of the religion in 2006, wrote:

To the extent that I can judge it, the review policy does not in general seem to be much of a hindrance to serious research by most Baha’i authors. However, when it comes to sources on the central figures of Baha’i, the Universal House of Justice is particularly anxious to maintain control. For example, in connection with the publication of the memoirs of Ustad Muhammad-Ali-i Salmani (Baha’u’llah’s barber), the normal review process was supplemented with an extra review and a demand from the Universal House of Justice to omit certain passages—a demand that created much agitation, and somehow was not fully complied with by the publisher, Kalimat Press.

Mikhail Sergeev, in his book, Theory of Religious Cycles: Tradition, Modernity, and the Bahá'í Faith (2015) wrote:

Since, on the one hand, the essential features of the Bahá'í Administrative Order cannot be altered and, on the other, opposition can never be completely eliminated, those restrictions, as temporary as they may appear, will in fact remain permanent while taking various forms and shapes, including the review policy, the monitoring of the Internet, the protection of Faith by the Auxiliary Boards members and Counselors, and so on.
