= Robert Stockman =

American historian and religious scholar (born 1953)

Robert H. Stockman
- Born: October 6, 1953 (age 73); Granby, Connecticut, U.S.
- Education: Wesleyan University; Brown University; Harvard University
- Scientific career
- Fields: Baháʼí studies
- Workplaces: DePaul University; Indiana University South Bend

Robert H. Stockman (born October 6, 1953) is a scholar specializing in Baháʼí studies who has been called "the foremost historian of the Baháʼí Faith in America." He received his undergraduate degree from Wesleyan University (B.A., 1975) and a doctorate in religious studies from Harvard University (Th.D., 1990).

== Background ==
Robert Stockman was raised in Granby, Connecticut by Harold Herman and Margery (Fothergill) Stockman, who worked as apple farmers. He initially majored in geology at Wesleyan University and later received a master's degree in planetary science from Brown University, with a particular interest in the geology of Mars. He was introduced to the Baháʼí Faith while an undergraduate student and converted at the age of twenty, on October 16, 1973. He has been an active Baháʼí since his conversion, and in 1979 participated in mass teachings in rural central Florida.

During his studies for his master's degree in geology, he developed an interest in the history of the Baháʼí community in Rhode Island which led to his researching the biography of Thornton Chase. This endeavor led to the publication of Baha'i Faith in America: Origins 1892–1900, followed by Baha'i Faith in America, The: Early Expansion, 1900–1912 Volume 2 before the ultimate publishing of Thornton Chase: First American Baha'i. Starting in 1989, he has worked for the National Spiritual Assembly of the United States, based in Wilmette, Illinois, in various capacities. He is married to Mana Derakhshani.

== Career ==
Subsequent to earning his doctorate from Harvard Divinity School, Stockman began teaching at the DePaul University in Chicago prior to proceeding to his current position as a lecturer at Indiana University South Bend, where he teaches religious studies. He serves as director of the Wilmette Institute. He has served on the boards of the Baháʼí Encyclopedia project, the Association for Baháʼí studies, and World Order magazine. He has lectured on Baháʼí topics across the world and is a frequent contributor to Baháʼí panels at the American Academy of Religion.

== Articles ==
- Review of "In Service to the Common Good: The American Baháʼí Community's Commitment to Social Change," in World Order, vol. 37, no. 3 (2006), 45-48.
- "The Baha'i Faith and Globalization, 1900–1912," in a peer-reviewed volume on globalization and the Baháʼí Faith (Aarhus, Den.: Aarhus University Press, 2005).
- "The Baháʼí Faith," in the Worldmark Encyclopedia.
- Review of Peter D. Ward and Donald Brownlee, “Life and Death of Planet Earth,” in World Order, vol. 34, no. 3 (Spring 2003), 42-47.
- "The Baháʼí Faith and Interfaith Relations: A Brief History," in World Order, vol. 33, no. 4 (Summer 2002), 19-33.
- "Baháʼí Faith," in Religions of the World: A Comprehensive Encyclopedia of Beliefs and Practices, ed. J. Gordon Melton and Martin Baumann (Santa Barbara, CA: ABC-Clio, 2002), 102-114
- "True, Corinne Knight," in Women Building Chicago, 1790–1990, ed. Rima Lunin Schultz and Adele Hast (Bloomington, IN: Indiana University Press, 2001), 891-93.
- "Baháʼí faith," in Encyclopedia of American Religious History, ed. Edward L. Queen II, Stephen R. Prothero, and Gardiner H. Shattuck Jr. (New York, NY: Facts on File, 2001), 53-55.
- "The Unity Principle: Ideas of Social Concord and Discord in the Baháʼí Faith," in Joseph Gittler, ed., Research in Human Social Conflict, Volume 2 (Westview, CT: JAI Press, 2000), pp. 1–19.
- Response to Juan R. I Cole, “Race, Immorality, and Money in the American Baháʼí Community: Impeaching the Los Angeles Spiritual Assembly,” Religion (2000) 30, 133-39.
- "Baháʼí Faith," in James R. Lewis, The Encyclopedia of Cults, Sects, and New Religions (Amherst, NY: Prometheus Books, 1998), 64-71.
- "Revelation, Interpretation, and Elucidation in the Baháʼí Writings", in Moojan Momen, ed., Scripture and Revelation (Oxford: George Ronald, 1998).
- The Baháʼí Faith section of The Pluralism Project (CD Rom, Columbia Univ. Press, 1997).
- "The Baháʼí Faith in England and Germany, 1900–1913", in World Order magazine, vol. 27, no. 3, (Spring 1996), 31-42.
- "The Vision of the Baháʼí Faith," in Martin Forward, Ultimate Visions: Reflections on the Religions We Choose (Oxford: One World, 1995), 266-74.
- "The Baháʼí Faith in the 1990s," article in Dr. Timothy Miller, ed., America's Alternative Religions (Albany: State Univ. of New York Press, 1995)
- "The Baháʼí Faith: A Portrait," in Joel Beversluis, ed., A Sourcebook for the Earth's Community of Religions, 2d ed. (Grand Rapids. MI: CoNexus Press, 1995).
- Paul Johnson's "Theosophical Influence in Baháʼí History: Some Comments", in Theosophical History, vol. 5, no. 4 (October 1994): 137-43.
- "The Baháʼí Faith in America: One Hundred Years," in World Order, vol. 25, no. 3 (Spring 1994): 9-23.
- "Women in the American Baháʼí Community, 1900–1912," in World Order, vol. 25, no. 2 (Winter 1993–94): 17-34.
- "Jesus Christ in the Baháʼí Writings," in The Baháʼí Studies Review, vol. 2, no. 1 (1992): 33-41.
- Review of John S. Hatcher's "The Purpose of Physical Reality," in Encyclopedie Universelle Philosophique (Presses Universitaires de France, 1991).
- Review of Marzieh Gail's "Summon Up Remembrance", in Iranian Studies, 22.4 (1989): 118-20.
- Review of R. Jackson Armstrong-Ingram's "Music, Devotions, and Mashriqu'l-Adhkár," in The Journal of Baháʼí Studies, vol. 1, no. 2 (1988–89): 71-78.
- "Passing of the First American Baháʼí," in Baháʼí News, no. 679 (Oct. 1987): 4-9.
- "The Baháʼí Faith: Beginnings in North America,” World Order magazine, vol. 18, no. 4 (Summer 1984): 7-27.

== Books ==
- Stockman, Robert (1985). Origins, 1892–1900. The Baha'i Faith in America. Vol. 1. Wilmette, Ill.: Baha'i Publishing Trust of the United States. ISBN 978-0-87743-199-2.
- Stockman, R. (May 1995). Early Expansion, 1900–1912. The Baha'i Faith in America. Vol. 2. Wilmette, Ill.: George Ronald. ISBN 978-0-87743-282-1.
- Stockman, R. (1997). A resource guide for the scholarly study of the Baha'i Faith. Wilmette, Ill.: Research Office, Baha i National Center; Ed. 7 edition. ASIN B0006FCHFU.
- Stockman, R. (2001). Thornton Chase: First American Baha'i. Wilmette, Ill.: Baha'i Publishing Trust of the United States. ISBN 978-0-87743-282-1.
- Stockman, R. (2012). Abdu'l-Baha in America. Wilmette, Ill.: Baha'i Publishing Trust of the United States. ISBN 978-1-931847-97-1.
- Stockman, R. (2012). Baha'i Faith: A Guide For The Perplexed (Guides For The Perplexed). Bloomsbury. ISBN 9781441187819.
- Stockman, Robert H. (July 2020). James R. Lewis; Margo Kitts (eds.). The Bahá'í Faith, Violence, and Non-Violence. Cambridge Elements; Elements in Religion and Violence (online ed.). Cambridge, UK: Cambridge University Press. doi:10.1017/9781108613446. ISBN 9781108613446. OCLC 1173507653. S2CID 225389995.
- Stockman, Robert, ed. (2022). The World of the Bahá'í Faith. Abingdon, UK: Routledge. doi:10.4324/9780429027772. ISBN 978-1-138-36772-2. S2CID 244692979.
