= Aekvarunyoo Amrapala =

- เอกวรัญญู อัมระปาล

Assistant Secretary to the Governor of Bangkok and Bangkok Metropolitan Administration Spokesperson
- Incumbent
- Assumed office 1 June 2022
- Governor: Chadchart Sittipunt

Personal details
- Education: Mahidol University International College (BBA); Portland State University (MS)

Aekvarunyoo Amrapala (Thai: เอกวรัญญู อัมระปาล) is a Thai civil servant and journalist, serving as assistant secretary to the governor of Bangkok and spokesperson for the Bangkok Metropolitan Administration (BMA) since 2022.

== Early life and education ==
Aekvarunyoo attended Bangkok Christian College.

He holds a bachelor's degree in International Business Administration from Mahidol University International College and a Master of Science in International Management at Portland State University.

== Career ==
Previously worked as a journalist and TV producer at Voice TV. On 1 June 2022, he was appointed BMA spokesperson and assisistant secretary following the election of Chadchart Sittipunt.
