= European Union–Thailand Intervarsity Debate Championship =

Debate tournament

The EU Thailand National Inter-varsity Debate Championship, more commonly known as EU-TH, is a purely student-led debate tournament originally evolving from the European Union-Thammasat University (EU-TU) Intra-varsity Debate Championship in 2004 at Thammasat University and was open for university students across Thailand. Starting in 2005, for five years, Thammasat University hosted the tournament and directed it to grow in size and quality by including other universities including Assumption University, Chulalongkorn University, Kasetsart University and Mahidol University International College. In 2008, with increasing popularity and high standards of the debate the scope of the event was even more broadened to include teams of high-schools students. Each year, the delegation of European Union to Thailand serves as the primary title sponsor of the event and a member of the adjudicator panel for the Grand Finals.

In 2010, Mahidol University International College (MUIC) was selected to be the host and co-organiser of the event in an open bidding process during the Thai National Debate Council. It was the first time that training workshops were held in four different provinces of Thailand (Southern, Central, Northeastern and Northern) for the run-up to the Championship's final round in Bangkok. More than 300 students from 26 universities participated, representing all regions of the Kingdom. As a result, the level of debate and the participants' performance continued to improve. Also, for the first time, the tournament was held under the environment-conscious theme "Offsetting Carbon, Offsetting Ignorance".

With the increasing number of participants nationwide, the tournament in 2012 was hosted for the first time outside of Bangkok in Khon Kaen province by Khon Kaen University. This tournament is also the first to receive the royal patronage of Crown Princess Maha Chakri Sirindhorn in its trophies to winners.

In 2015, the tournament was reverted to Thammasat University as the host.

The EU Thailand Inter-varsity Debate Championship is now the largest and most anticipated national Inter-varsity English debate tournament in Thailand, involving more than 500 students more than 20 academic institutions. It is a direct channel for young people to engage in productive cultural, political, and economic exchanges of ideas.

== Past winners ==
Championship (Year)	Winning team	Debaters	Runner-up Team	Best Speaker of the Tournament	Core Adjudication Panel (CAP) Members
15th EU-TH (2024)	University Champions: Thammasat University 3 University Novice Champions: Thammasat University 2 High School Champions: Shrewsbury International School Riverside 1 High School Novice Champions: Shrewsbury International School Riverside 2	High School Champions: Torfun Chittmittrapap, Poomkarn Taedullayasatit, Jirasita Tohtubtiang High School Novice Champions: Kamonnat Thamakaison, Nisha Krisralam, Naravid Tejavanija	(TBD)	(TBD)	
10th EU-TH (2015)	Chulalongkorn Team 1	Ms. Rawiporn Rangponsumrit Mr. Jesse Victoroff Mr. Peeratat Nganthavee	MUIC 1		
9th EU-TH (2014)	Mahidol University International College Team 1	Mr. Panyarak Roque Mr. Narongpol Sathorn Mr. Zaw Htun Lat		Mr. Panyarak Roque	no information
8th EU-TH (2012)	Chulalongkorn Team 1	Ms. Arpaporn Tangkrisanakajorn Mr. Chayapat Thongcharoen Mr. Motoki Luxmiwattana		Ms. Arpaporn Tangkrisanakajorn	Mr. Honey Manchanda
7th EU-TH (2011)	Mahidol University International College Team 1	Mr. Panyarak Roque Ms. Sasikarn Daphne Hingert Mr. Narongpol Sathorn	Mahidol University International College Team 2	Mr. Yuttana Saisangkagomon	Ms. Wen-Yu Weng
6th EU-TH (2010)	Mahidol University International College Team 1	Ms. Wen-Yu Weng Mr. Panyarak Roque Mr. Tawin Kim	Assumption University Team 1	Ms. Wen-Yu Weng Ms. Chayaporn Woraming	Mr. Mohamed Mabrook Azeez
5th EU-Thamasat University (2009)	Mahidol University International College Team 1	Mr. Mohamed Mabrook Azeez Ms. Wen-Yu Weng Mr. Tanawat Phaovibul	Assumption University Team 1	Mr. Mohamed Mabrook Azeez	no information
4th EU-Thammasat University (2008)	Mahidol University International College Team 1	Mr. Mohamed Mabrouq Azeez Mr. Michael Mergy Krause Luangpi Chai Sungsanoi	Mahidol University International College Team 2	Luangpi Chai Sungsanoi	Ms. Praewta Sorasuchart
3rd EU-Thammasat University (2007)	Mahidol University International College Team 2	Mr. Michael Mergy Krause Mr. C. P. Dirin Dinesh Mr. Sagar Jhalani		Ms. Sureerat Sachanakul	no information
2nd EU-Thammasat University (2006)	Thammasat University Team 1	Ms. Praewta Sorasuchart Mr. Aekaraj Guruvanich Mr. Pachara Yongjiranon		no information	Ms. Rattana Lao
1st EU-Thammasat University (2006)	Mahidol University International College Team 1	Mr. Trapal Narula Mr. Apirat Kongchanakul Ms. Dithaya Punyarathabandhul		no information	Mr. Peejay Garcia
