= Denis MacEoin =

British academic, scholar and writer (1949–2022)

- Born: 26 January 1949; Belfast
- Died: 6 June 2022 (aged 73)
- Other names: Daniel Easterman; Jonathan Aycliffe

Academic background
- Education: Trinity College Dublin; University of Edinburgh; King's College, Cambridge

Denis M. MacEoin (26 January 1949 – 6 June 2022) was a British academic, scholar and writer with a focus on Persian, Arabic and Islamic studies. He authored several academic books and articles, as well as many pieces of journalism. Since 2014 he published a number of essays on current events with a Middle Eastern focus at the Gatestone Institute, of which he was a Senior Fellow. He was a Senior Editor from 2009 to 2010 at Middle East Quarterly, a publication of the American think tank Middle East Forum, where he was also a Fellow.

From 2006 to 2015 MacEoin wrote a blog entitled A Liberal Defence of Israel, "designed to correct the false impression that Israel is an illiberal, fascist, or apartheid state." In 2007 he authored a report entitled The Hijacking of British Islam, which garnered considerable criticism labelling him as a neo-conservative and accusations of forgery.

As a novelist, MacEoin wrote under the pen names Daniel Easterman and Jonathan Aycliffe. MacEoin was a former Baháʼí and wrote in 2009 that he considered himself a secular humanist.

In early June 2022, MacEoin died, aged 73, due to COVID-19 complications.

== Education and academic career ==
MacEoin was born in Belfast, Northern Ireland. He received a BA and MA in English Language and Literature at Trinity College Dublin, an MA in Persian, Arabic, and Islamic studies at the University of Edinburgh (1975), and a PhD in Persian and Islamic studies at King's College, Cambridge (1979).

From 1979 to 1980, he taught English, Islamic Civilization, and Arabic-English translation at Mohammed V University in Fez, Morocco, resigning from the university shortly after commencing employment there. MacEoin claimed the resignation was due to disputes over contract changes, working environment and payment for his services as a lecturer. He then taught at Newcastle University, but his Saudi sponsors dropped him for teaching "heretical subjects", following which he left academia.

=== Fellowships ===
In 1986, he was made Honorary Fellow in the Centre for Islamic and Middle East Studies at Durham University. He was the Royal Literary Fund Fellow, assisting with academic writing at Newcastle University from 2005 to 2008. In 2014 he became a Senior Fellow at the Gatestone Institute.

== Scholarship on the Bahá’í Faith ==
MacEoin was an active member of the Baháʼí Faith from 1966 to 1980, during which time he lectured and wrote in support of his faith. In the late 1970s he wrote a manuscript on the Bábí movement. As a Baháʼí publishing material on the religion, he was required to submit his material for a Baháʼí review process, and his manuscript was rejected. He resigned from the Bahá'í Faith and later published the material with E.J. Brill as The Sources for Early Bābī Doctrine and History. Thereafter, his scholarship took an increasingly adversarial tone, reflected in a series of controversial articles in the journal Religion between 1982 and 1986 that reinterpreted early Bábí history through themes of jihad, militancy, and political struggle. His work provoked rebuttals from Bahá’í scholars William Hatcher and Muhammad Afnan, who accused him of distortion and bias in a series of responses published in Religion. Other scholars, including Juan Cole and Moojan Momen, also challenged his methods and conclusions, citing his tendency toward polemical rather than objective analysis, uncritical reliance on Azali sources, imbalance in assessing Bahá’í accounts, and personal bias following his departure from the Bahá’í community. MacEoin, in turn, took the position that he alone possessed the necessary objectivity to study the Bahá’í Faith, dismissing Bahá’í scholars as biased practitioners incapable of meeting Western academic standards. Critics have described his approach as exemplifying classic Orientalism — privileging Western academic perspectives while dismissing insider voices.

MacEoin has also been criticized for comparing the persecution of Bahá’ís in Iran—described by human rights organizations as crimes against humanity—to anti-cult movements in the West. Some of his works are valued by scholars for their textual data but are regarded as methodologically flawed and best read as philological rather than accurate representations of Bahá’í or Bábí practice. His later writings have likewise been criticized for disregarding the growing body of research on the Bábí movement.

== Public commentary on Islam and the Middle East ==
In his later years, MacEoin turned his attention to Islam and Middle Eastern politics, shifting from academic writing to polemical public commentary. While his early work, such as co-editing Islam in the Modern World (1983), reflected an academic engagement with Islamic studies, his later writings for conservative think tanks such as Civitas and, especially, the Gatestone Institute—for which he wrote more than one hundred articles, and which he was a Senior Fellow — adopted a strongly critical stance toward Islam. He argued that Sharia law was incompatible with Western legal and cultural norms and portrayed Muslim immigration as a civilizational threat to Europe.

MacEoin’s articles frequently associated Islam with violence, misogyny, and resistance to modernity.

These writings drew widespread criticism for perpetuating Islamophobia, as the Gatestone Institute has been identified as a major source of anti-Muslim rhetoric by organizations such as the Center for American Progress, and its role in promoting Islamophobia has been documented by the Southern Poverty Law Center. Reports by independent media and advocacy groups, including NBC News and the Council on American–Islamic Relations (CAIR), as well as academic and policy analyses such as the Carter Center’s report Countering the Islamophobia Industry, have further noted the Institute’s contribution to anti-Muslim discourse.

Additionally, his 2007 report for Policy Exchange, The Hijacking of British Islam: How Extremist Literature is Subverting Mosques in the UK, was accused by the BBC's Newsnight of relying on forged evidence, including allegedly fabricated receipts purportedly showing extremist texts sold at mosques. Some of the mosques named denied the claims, and forensic analysis reportedly indicated that some of the receipts originated from the same source. The controversy led to legal action from the North London Central Mosque Trust.

== Publications ==
=== Academic ===
MacEoin published extensively on Islamic topics, contributing to the Encyclopaedia of Islam, the Oxford Encyclopaedia of Islam in the Modern World, the Encyclopædia Iranica, the Penguin Handbook of Religions, journals, festschrifts, and books, and has himself written a number of academic books.

- The Hijacking of British Islam: How Extremist Literature is Subverting Mosques in the UK. London: Policy Exchange. 2007. ISBN 978-1-906097-10-3.
- Music, Chess and Other Sins (PDF). London: Civitas. 2009. ISBN 978-1906837068. (Report on radicalism in about 80 schools in the UK)
- Dear Gary, Why You're Wrong about Israel. US: Library of Middle Eastern Democracy. 2013. ISBN 978-0957482500.
- The Sources for Early Bābī Doctrine and History. Leiden: Brill. 1992. ISBN 978-9004094628.
- Rituals in Babism and Baha'ism. UK: British Academic Press and Centre of Middle Eastern Studies, University of Cambridge. 1994. ISBN 1-85043-654-1.
- The Messiah of Shiraz: Studies in Early and Middle Babism. Leiden: Brill. 2009. ISBN 978-90-04-17035-3.

=== Novels ===
From 1986, MacEoin pursued a career as a novelist, writing 26 novels. He used the pen names Daniel Easterman (international thrillers) and Jonathan Aycliffe (ghost stories).

==== As Daniel Easterman ====
- The Last Assassin (1984)
- The Seventh Sanctuary (1987)
- The Ninth Buddha (1988)
- Brotherhood of the Tomb (1989)
- Night of the Seventh Darkness (1991)
- The Name of the Beast (1992)
- New Jerusalems: Reflections on Islam, Fundamentalism and the Rushdie Affair (1993)
- The Judas Testament (1994)
- Day of Wrath-Night of the Apocalypse (1995)
- The Final Judgement (1996)
- K is for Killing (1997)
- Incarnation (1998)
- The Jaguar Mask (2000)
- Midnight Comes at Noon (2001)
- Maroc (2002)
- The Sword (2007)
- Spear of Destiny (2009)

==== As Jonathan Aycliffe ====
- Naomi's Room (1991)
- Whispers in the Dark (1992)
- The Vanishment (1993)
- The Matrix (1994)
- The Lost (1996)
- The Talisman (1999)
- A Shadow On the Wall (2000)
- A Garden Lost in Time (2004)
- The Silence of Ghosts (2013)

== Sources ==
- Afnan, Muhammad; Hatcher, William S. (1985). "Western Islamic Scholarship and Bahá'í Origins". Religion. 15 (1): 29–51. doi:10.1016/0048-721X(85)90058-2.
- Afnan, Muhammad; Hatcher, William S. (1986). "Note on Maceoin's 'Bahá'í Fundamentalism'". Religion. 16 (2): 187–195. doi:10.1016/S0048-721X(86)80006-9.
- MacEoin, Denis (1982). "The Babi Concept of Holy War". Religion. 12 (2): 93–129. doi:10.1016/0048-721X(82)90023-9.
- MacEoin, Denis (1983). "From Babism to Bahá'ísm: Problems of Militancy, Quietism, and Conflation in the Construction of a Religion". Religion. 13 (3): 219–55. doi:10.1016/0048-721X(83)90022-2.
- MacEoin, Denis (1 January 1986c). "Bahā'ī fundamentalism and the academic study of the Bābī movement". Religion. 16 (1): 60. doi:10.1016/0048-721X(86)90006-0. ISSN 0048-721X.
- MacEoin, Denis (1986). "Afnán, Hatcher and an old bone". Religion. 16 (2): 187–195. doi:10.1016/S0048-721X(86)80007-0.
- MacEoin, Denis (1992). The Sources for Early Bābī Doctrine and History. Leiden: Brill. ISBN 978-9004094628.
- MacEoin, Denis (2007). The Hijacking of British Islam: How Extremist Literature is Subverting Mosques in the UK. London: Policy Exchange. ISBN 978-1-906097-10-3.
- MacEoin, Denis (2009b). The Messiah of Shiraz: Studies in Early and Middle Babism. Leiden: Brill Publishers. ISBN 978-90-04-17035-3.
- MacEoin, Denis (March 2011), Letter to Edinburgh University Student Association Written following EUSA's 14 March vote to boycott Israeli goods. From his 6 April 2011 blog post.
- Momen, Moojan (8 June 2007). "Marginality and Apostasy in the Baha'i Community". Religion. 37 (3). Elsevier: 187–209. doi:10.1016/j.religion.2007.06.008. ISSN 0048-721X. S2CID 55630282.
- "Denis MacEoin". www.rlf.org.uk. Royal Literary Fund.
- "Denis MacEoin". www.gatestoneinstitute.org. Gatestone Institute: International Policy Council. Archived from the original on 8 January 2018. (archived)
