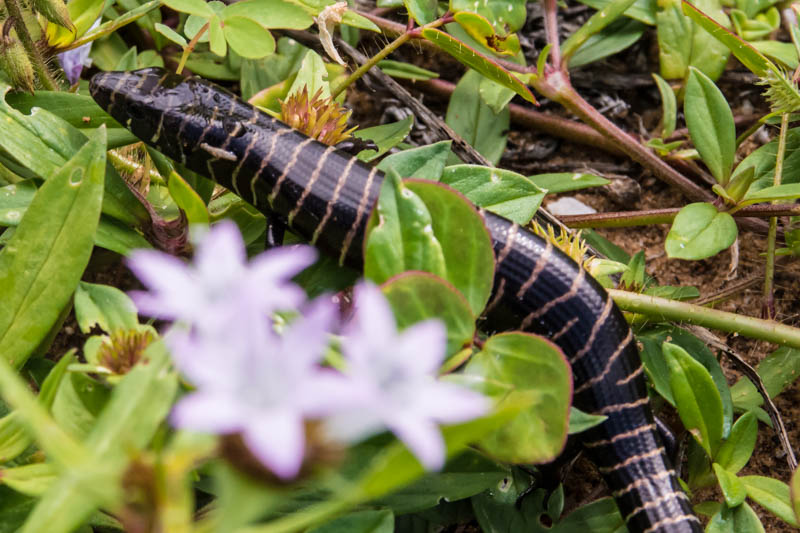

Conservation status
- Least Concern (IUCN 3.1)

Scientific classification
- Kingdom: Animalia
- Phylum: Chordata
- Class: Reptilia
- Order: Squamata
- Suborder: Anguimorpha
- Family: Diploglossidae
- Genus: Diploglossus
- Species: D. lessonae

Binomial name
- Diploglossus lessonae Peracca, 1890
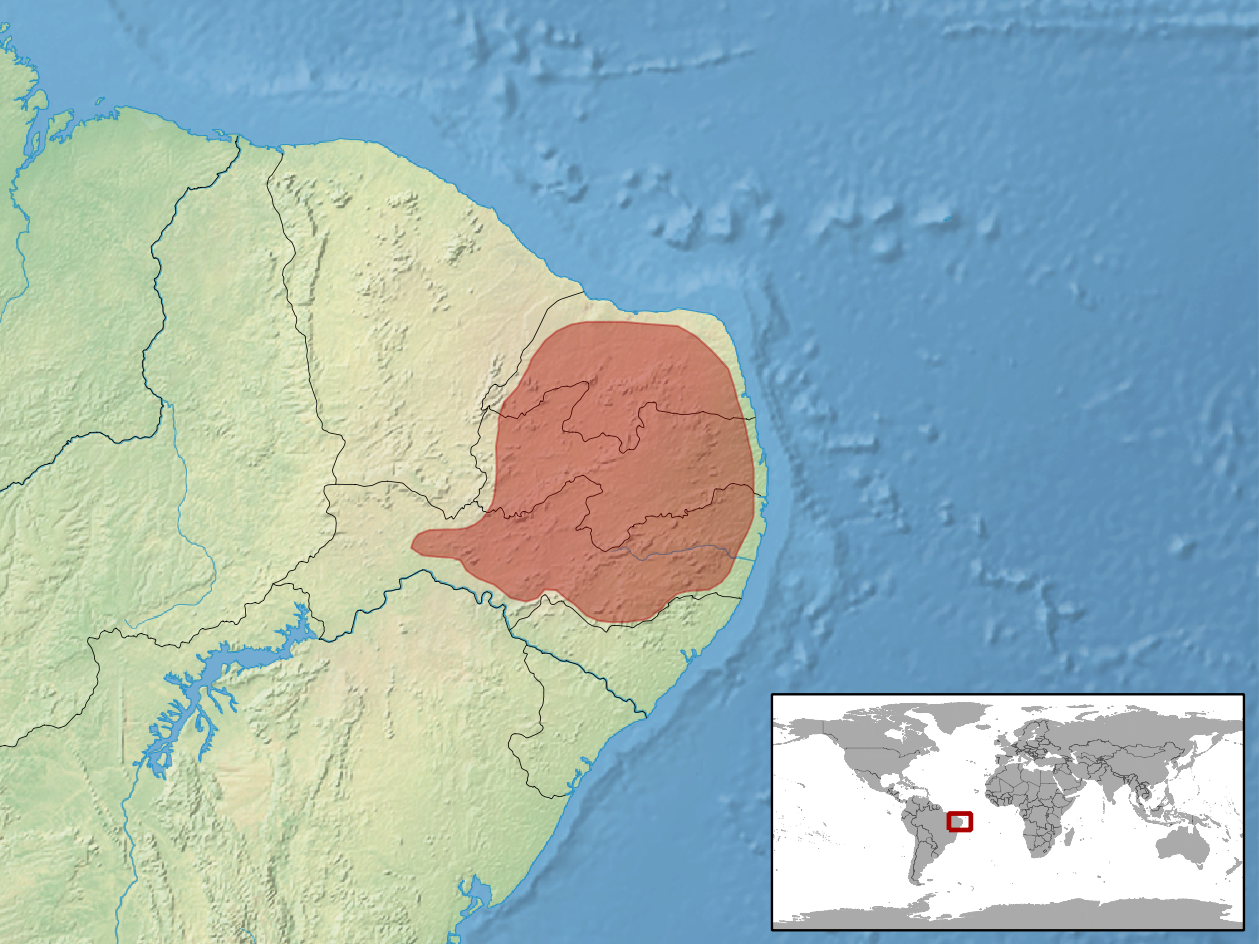

= Brazilian galliwasp =

Species of lizard

The Brazilian galliwasp (Diploglossus lessonae) is a carnivorous species of lizard in the family Diploglossidae. The species is endemic to Brazil. It is known in Brazilian Portuguese as calango coral, calango liso, and several other common names.

== Etymology ==
D. lessonae is named in honour of Italian zoologist Michele Lessona.

== Description ==
D. lessonae grows to a total length (including tail) of about 30 cm (12 in), and has a lifespan of roughly 10 years. Offspring are zebra-patterned, with white and black stripes circling their bodies. Adults are brown, with red/yellow-coloured heads and undersides, and have small legs.

== Geographic range ==
D. lessonae is found in northeastern Brazil.

== Habitat ==
D. lessonae is commonly found in semiarid environments, scrub, and low forests.

== Behavior ==
D. lessonae is terrestrial, diurnal, and semi-fossorial.

== Diet ==
D. lessonae preys upon insects.

== Reproduction ==
D. lessonae is oviparous. The adult female lays one clutch per year, during the dry season, and clutch size varies from one to seven eggs.
