= Naomi's Room =

1991 novel by Jonathan Aycliffe

- First edition
- Author: Jonathan Aycliffe
- Language: English
- Publisher: HarperCollins
- Publication date: 21 Nov 1991
- Publication place: United Kingdom
- Media type: Print
- Pages: 172
- ISBN: 0-246-13926-9

Naomi's Room is a 1991 horror novel by Northern Irish author Jonathan Aycliffe.

== Plot introduction ==
Pembroke College academic Charles Hillenbrand looks back on his life and his marriage to Laura, who gave up her job at the Fitzwilliam Museum on the birth of their daughter Naomi. On Christmas Eve 1970, Charles took his four-year-old daughter on a shopping trip from Cambridge to London by train. Naomi disappeared in Hamleys toy shop, and days later her mutilated body was discovered in Spitalfields. But Naomi does not rest in peace and Charles and Laura are haunted by her presence as other murders follow. The policeman leading the investigation is found with his throat cut in the crypt of a church near Brick Lane, then a press photographer who had shown Charles disturbing images in the photos he had taken is murdered, parts of his body found strewn along a Spitalfields alley...

== Reception ==
- "A Chilling story which gives the lie to any notion that supernatural horror is remotely therapeutic. Aycliffe has a fine touch." The Independent
- "A powerful psychological ghost story... the residual spirit of Jack the Ripper complicates matters and initially seems to intrude too much on the core story, but Aycliffe eventually resolves things quite neatly."
