= Engaging the Muslim World =

2009 book by Juan Cole

- First edition
- Author: Juan Cole
- Language: English
- Genre: Non-fiction
- Publisher: Palgrave Macmillan
- Publication date: March 17, 2009
- Publication place: United States
- Media type: Print
- Pages: 288 pages
- ISBN: 0-230-60754-3
- OCLC: 236082809
- Dewey Decimal: 303.48/21767073 22
- LC Class: DS35.74.U6 C65 2009
- Preceded by: Napoleon's Egypt: Invading the Middle East

Engaging the Muslim World (ISBN 0230607543) is a 2009 non-fiction book about the relationship between the United States and the Arab and Muslim worlds written by University of Michigan historian Juan Cole. His goal in writing the book was to illustrate the true Muslim perspective towards the U.S. and explain why that has developed. The book recommends full engagement and diplomacy with all forms of Islam and criticizes the policy of preemptive military action, arguing that it should be only used as a last resort. The book blasts what it calls the Bush administration's "Islamophobic discourse".

== Summary ==
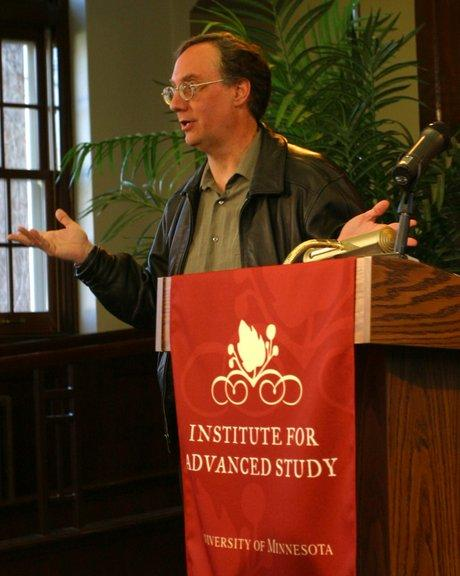
Juan Cole as pictured in May 2007.

Cole makes five central points. First, he states that Al-Qaeda is better thought of as a small cult rather than a true mass movement like Fascism or Communism in the early 20th century. Second, he states that the Muslim world contains large sections of people who can be potential allies to the U.S. Third, he states that American energy independence cannot really happen. Fourth, he states that Iran is not an implacable enemy of the U.S. and should be engaged with. Fifth, he states that coalition forces in Iraq should undergo a careful, deliberate military disengagement rather than an immediate withdrawal or an extended military presence.

Cole makes an analogy between Islamists and what he sees as similar American groups. He views Salafi jihadists as fundamentalist vigilantes similar to Timothy McVeigh while Wahabis can be seen as similar to the Amish. Cole argues that a distinction should be made between al-Qaeda and non-violent, compromising political Islamists such as the Muslim Brotherhood the same way far-right militias in the U.S. are distinguished from the center-right Republican Party.

== Reviews ==
The American Prospect stated that "Cole has delivered an important book that members of the administration would be wise to read en route to the Middle East." The Economist called it a "balanced and effective antidote to oversimplified Western views of Islam" and stated that it "manages to prick western misconceptions". Kirkus Reviews labeled it a "well-reasoned, useful vision for Western-Muslim relations." Vali Nasr, bestselling author of The Shia Revival: How Conflicts Within Islam Will Shape the Future, commented that "Cole looks deep into what went wrong to show the way forward to a new engagement of the Muslim World" and he described the book as "[i]ntelligent, clear and erudite."

Library Journal wrote that:

A leading American expert on the Islamic world, seeks to dispel many of the persistent myths about Islam and the Middle East. Cole convincingly demonstrates why one should not confuse Muslim activism with hidebound fundamentalism. The chapter dealing with Iran is particularly informative and evenhanded, and the analysis of myriad issues in U.S.-Iran relations is a welcome antidote to the barrage of alarmist commentaries on Iran in much of the U.S. press. This readable and intelligent book is a must read for policymakers and the informed public.

Publishers Weekly gave a more critical review, stating that "For all his expertise, Cole fails to source some of his harshest accusations; moreover, for a scholar championing greater subtlety of thought, he too often discards nuance himself." The article also labeled the book a "missed opportunity". The New York Times disputed some of Cole's key points. It criticized Cole's comparison of Islamist groups with American militias and Cole's downplaying of Iran's nuclear program, remarking that "The [weapons] inspectors tell a very different story."

== See also ==
- Foreign policy of the United States
- American intervention in the Middle East
- Muslim attitudes towards terrorism
- Islamophobia
