= Michele Lessona =

Italian zoologist (1823–1894)

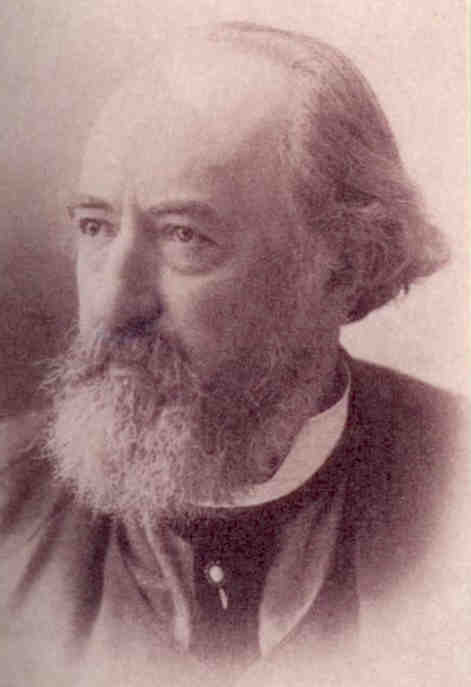
- Born: 20 September 1823; Venaria Reale
- Died: 20 July 1894 (aged 70); Turin, Italy
- Education: University of Turin
- Scientific career
- Fields: Natural sciences, Zoology

Michele Lessona (20 September 1823, Venaria Reale, Piedmont – 20 July 1894, Turin) was an Italian zoologist.

Michele Lessona became a specialist in amphibians. His accomplishments include translating certain works of Darwin, for example, The Descent of Man, and Selection in Relation to Sex.

== Biography ==
Lessona studied medicine in Turin, afterwards relocating to Egypt, where he worked in a hospital outside of Cairo as hospital director at Karnak. From 1850 he studied natural sciences at Turin, and in the meantime found employment as a secondary school teacher. In 1854 he attained the chair of mineralogy and zoology at the University of Genoa.

In 1862, with Filippo de Filippi, he took part in a scientific and diplomatic mission to Persia, and after his return to Italy, he was named chair of zoology at the University of Bologna in 1863. In 1867 he became chair of zoology and comparative anatomy at the University of Turin. He was the first to translate Darwin's The Descent of Man into Italian, in 1871. He was also a Senator of the Kingdom from 1877 to 1894.

== Eponyms ==
Lessona has several herpetological species named after him, such as Pelophylax lessonae, Diploglossus lessonae, and Trapelus lessonae.

== Works ==
Partial list

- Volere è potere, 1869. Florence.
- Carlo Darwin. 1883. Reissued by Kessinger, 2009, ISBN 978-1-104-06962-9.
- Venti anni fa 1884. Reissued by Kessinger, 2009, ISBN 978-1-104-52050-2.
- Le cacce in Persia. 1884. Rome. Reissued by Kessinger, 2010, ISBN 9781167477102.
