= Baháʼí Studies Review =

- Discipline: Religious Studies
- Language: English
- Edited by: Steve Cooney

Publication details
- History: 1991 (34 years ago) to 2015 (10 years ago)
- Publisher: Intellect, on behalf of: Association for Baháʼí Studies (English-Speaking Europe) 1991 to February 2006; Association for Baháʼí Studies (United Kingdom) March 2006 to 2015
- Frequency: Annually

Standard abbreviations
- ISO 4: Bahá'í Stud. Rev.

Indexing
- ISSN: 1354-8697 (print); 2040-1701 (web)
- LCCN: 94641921
- OCLC no.: 30061083

Links
- Journal homepage

Baháʼí Studies Review was a peer-reviewed academic journal, published annually from 1991 to 2015, that covered contemporary issues regarding the principles, history, and philosophy of the Baháʼí Faith. Note that some formats, including the ISO 4 record, use "Bahaʼi" or "Bahá'í" rather than the "Baháʼí" shown at the official website.

== History ==
The journal was published by Intellect Books, on behalf of the Association for Baháʼí Studies (English-Speaking Europe) from 1991 to February 2006, then the Association for Baháʼí Studies (United Kingdom) thereafter.

Both versions of the "Association" were agencies of the National Spiritual Assembly of the United Kingdom.

Association for Baháʼí Studies (English-Speaking Europe) issued Volume 1 (1991) through to Volume 13 (2005), with volumes 9 and 10 delayed enough that they were released as double issues (1999/2000 and 2001/2002, respectively).

== Abstracting and indexing ==
The journal is abstracted and indexed in:

- ATLA Religion Database
- Humanities International Complete
- Humanities International Index
- ProQuest Central
- TOC Premier

== See also ==
- Baháʼí studies
