= Moojan Momen =

British-Iranian Baháʼí scholar (born 1950)

Moojan Momen (Note: Given name is pronounced "Moo-zhaane") (born 1950) is a retired physician and historian specializing in Baháʼí studies who has published numerous books and articles about the Baháʼí Faith and Islam, especially Shia Islam, including for Encyclopædia Iranica the British Library, and is a Fellow of the Royal Asiatic Society of Great Britain and Ireland.

His book An introduction to Shi'i Islam has been used as required reading in university and seminary courses on Shia Islam. He won the 7th annual Thomas Robbins Award for Excellence in the Study of New Religious Movements in 2009 for his article “Millennialism and Violence: The Attempted Assassination of Nasir al-Din Shah of Iran by the Babis in 1852.” He is an editor of Baháʼí Studies Review and serves as a faculty member at the Bahá'í Wilmette Institute.

He was born 1950, in Tabriz, Iran, but the family migrated to England in 1955 where he was educated at Queen's College, Taunton, St John's College, Cambridge, and Guy's Hospital (teaching hospital), London. He is married to another scholar/publisher Wendi Momen.

== Articles ==
- Smith, Peter; Momen, Moojan (January 1989). "The Baha'i Faith 1957–1988: A survey of contemporary developments". Religion. 19 (1): 63–91. doi:10.1016/0048-721X(89)90077-8.
- Momen, Moojan (June 2005). "The Babi and Baha'i community of Iran: a case of "suspended genocide"?" (PDF). Journal of Genocide Research. 7 (2): 221–241. doi:10.1080/14623520500127431. S2CID 56704626.
- Momen, Moojan (2007). "Marginality and Apostasy in the Baha'i Community". Religion. 37 (3): 187–209. doi:10.1016/j.religion.2007.06.008. S2CID 55630282.
- Momen, Moojan (August 2008). "Millennialism and Violence: The Attempted Assassination of Nasir al-Din Shah of Iran by the Babis in 1852". Nova Religio: The Journal of Alternative and Emergent Religions. 12 (1): 57–82. doi:10.1525/nr.2008.12.1.57. JSTOR 10.1525/nr.2008.12.1.57.

== Articles in Encyclopaedia Iranica ==
- Adíb Tálaqání (Hand of the Cause), by Moojan Momen, in Encyclopaedia Iranica, Volume 1 (1985)
- Afnán: Genealogy of the Afnān Family, by Moojan Momen, in Encyclopaedia Iranica, Volume 1 (1985)
- Alí Akbar Shahmírzádí (Hájjí Akhund), by Moojan Momen, in Encyclopaedia Iranica, Volume 1 (1985)
- Amín Hájjí: trustees of Huqúqu'lláh, by Moojan Momen, in Encyclopaedia Iranica, Volume 1 (1985)
- Badasht, by Moojan Momen, in Encyclopaedia Iranica, Volume 3 (1989)
- Baha'i Pioneers, by Moojan Momen, in Encyclopaedia Iranica (2013)
- Bahá'í Conventions, by Moojan Momen, in Encyclopaedia Iranica, Volume 3 (1989)
- Bahá'íyyih Khánum, by Moojan Momen, in Encyclopaedia Iranica, Volume 3 (1989)
- Balyuzi, H. M., by Moojan Momen, in Encyclopaedia Iranica, Volume 3 (1989)
- Chase, Thornton, by Moojan Momen, in Encyclopaedia Iranica, Volume 5 (1992)
- Cosmogony and Cosmology, by Moojan Momen, in Encyclopaedia Iranica, Volume 6 (1993)
- Dhikr: in the Bábí and Bahá'í Religions, by Moojan Momen, in Encyclopaedia Iranica, Volume 7 (1996)
- Divorce, by Moojan Momen, in Encyclopaedia Iranica, Volume 7 (1996)
- Dolgorukov Memoirs, by Moojan Momen, in Encyclopaedia Iranica, Volume 7 (1996)
- Fayzí, Abu'l-Qásim (Hand of the Cause), by Moojan Momen, in Encyclopaedia Iranica, Volume 9 (1999)
- Festivals, Bahá'í, by Moojan Momen, in Encyclopaedia Iranica, Volume 9 (1999)
- Fádl Mázandarání, Mírzá Asadu'lláh, by Moojan Momen, in Encyclopaedia Iranica, Volume 9 (1999)
- Haydar Alí Isfahání, by Moojan Momen, in Encyclopaedia Iranica, Volume 12 (2004)
- Hidden Words (Kalemát-i-Maknuna), by Moojan Momen, in Encyclopaedia Iranica (2011)
- House of Justice (Baytu'l-'Adl), by Moojan Momen, in Encyclopaedia Iranica, Volume 3 (1989)
- Lawh (Tablet), by Moojan Momen and Todd Lawson, in Encyclopaedia Iranica (2005)
- Martyrs, Bábí, by Peter Smith and Moojan Momen, in Encyclopaedia Iranica (2005)
- Mashriqu'l-Adhkár, by Moojan Momen, in Encyclopaedia Iranica (2010)
- Mazhar-i Ilahi (Manifestation of God), by Moojan Momen, in Encyclopaedia Iranica (2016)
- Mírzá Abu'l-Fadl Gulpáyegání, by Moojan Momen, in Encyclopaedia Iranica, Volume 1 (1985)
- Nineteen Day Feast, by Moojan Momen, in Encyclopaedia Iranica (2014)
- Sabet, Habib, by Moojan Momen, in Encyclopaedia Iranica (2015)
- Shoghi Effendi, by Moojan Momen, in Encyclopaedia Iranica (2011)
- Sobhi, Fazlollah Mohtadi, by Moojan Momen, in Encyclopaedia Iranica (2015)
- Spiritual Assembly (Mahfel-i-Ruháni), by Moojan Momen, in Encyclopaedia Iranica (2011)
- Vahíd (Sayyed Yahyá Dárábí), by Moojan Momen, in Encyclopaedia Iranica, Volume 7 (1996)
- Women in the works of the Bab and in the Babi Movement, by Moojan Momen, in Encyclopaedia Iranica (2011)
- Zuhur al-Haqq, by Moojan Momen, in Encyclopaedia Iranica (2002)

== Chapters in books ==
- Momen, Moojan (2004). "Millennialist dreams and apocalyptic nightmares". In Sharon, Moshe (ed.). Studies in Modern Religions, Religious Movements, and the Babi-Bahá'í Faiths. Leiden: Brill. pp. 97–116. ISBN 90-04-13904-4.
- Momen, Moojan (2005). "The role of women in the Iranian Baha'i community during the Qajar period". In Robert Gleave; C. E. Bosworth; V. S. Curtis; R. M. Gleave; V. A. Martin (eds.). Religion and Society in Qajar Iran. RoutledgeCurzon/British Institute of Persian Studies(BIPS). Vol. 4. London: Taylor & Francis Group. pp. 346–370. ISBN 9780415573474. OCLC 606741540.
- Momen, Moojan (2014). "Between Karbalāʾ and Tabrīz; Contested Martyrdom Narratives". In Sasha Dehghani; Silvia Horsch-Al Saad; Eli Bar-Chen; Almut Sh. Bruckstein; Navid Kermani; Angelika Neuwirth; Andreas Pflitsch; Martin Tamcke (eds.). Martyrdom in the Modern Middle East. Ex Oriente Lux: Rezeptionen und Exegesen als traditionskritik. Vol. 14. Würzburg: Ergon Verlag. pp. 43–55. ISBN 978-3-95650-030-5. ISSN 1863-9348. OCLC 1256588197.

== Books ==
- Momen, Moojan, ed. (1981). The Bábí and Baháʼí Religions, 1844-1944: Some Contemporary Western Accounts. Oxford, UK: George Ronald. ISBN 0-85398-102-7.
- Momen, Moojan, ed. (1982). Studies in Babi And Baha'i History. Studies in the Babi and Baha'i Religions. Vol. 1. Los Angeles: Kalimat Press.
- Momen, Moojan (1985). An introduction to Shi'i Islam: the history and doctrines of Twelver Shi'ism. New Haven, CT: Yale University Press. ISBN 9780300035315. OCLC 473693840.
- Momen, Moojan, ed. (1987). Selections from the Writings of E.G. Browne on the Bábí and Baháʼí Religions. Oxford, UK: George Ronald. ISBN 0-85398-247-3.
- Momen, Moojan (1990). Hinduism and the Baháʼí Faith. Oxford, UK: George Ronald. ISBN 0-85398-299-6.
- Momen, Moojan (1991). "The Baháʼí Community of Ashkhabad: Its Social Basis and Importance in Baháʼí History". In Shirin Akiner (ed.). Cultural Change and Continuity in Central Asia. London, UK: Kegan Paul. pp. 278–305. ISBN 9780710303516.
- Momen, Moojan (1994). Buddhism and the Baháʼí Faith. Oxford, UK: George Ronald. ISBN 0-85398-384-4.
- Momen, Moojan (1997). A Short Introduction to the Baháʼí Faith. Oxford, UK: Oneworld Publications. ISBN 1-85168-209-0.
- Momen, Moojan (2000). Islam and the Baháʼí Faith, An Introduction to the Baháʼí Faith for Muslims. Oxford, UK: George Ronald. ISBN 0-85398-446-8.
- Momen, Moojan (2007). Baháʼu'lláh: A Short Biography. Oxford, UK: Oneworld Publications. ISBN 978-1-85168-469-4.
- Momen, Moojan (2008). The Baháʼí Faith: A Beginner's Guide. Oxford, UK: Oneworld Publications. ISBN 978-1-85168-563-9.
- Momen, Moojan (2009) [Originally published as The Phenomenon of Religion in 1999]. Understanding Religion: A Thematic Approach. Oxford, UK: Oneworld Publications. ISBN 978-1-85168-599-8. OL 25434252M.
- Momen, Moojan (2015). The Baha'i Communities of Iran, 1851-1921, Volume 1: The North of Iran. Oxford, UK: George Ronald. ISBN 978-0-85398-585-3.
