= Mahidol University International College =

University college in Thailand

- วิทยาลัยนานาชาติ มหาวิทยาลัยมหิดล
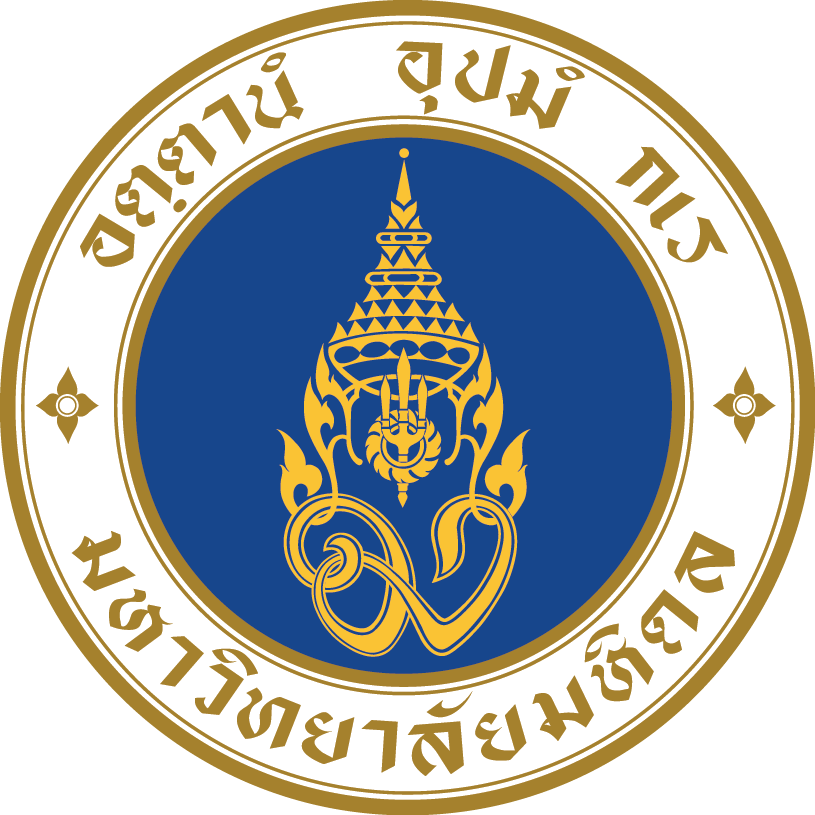
- Other names: MUIC
- Type: Public college
- Established: 1986
- Dean: Prof. Chulathida Chomchai, M.D.
- Location: Nakhon Pathom, Thailand; 13.794462°N 100.325605°E
- Campus: Salaya
- Colours: Purple
- Website: http://www.muic.mahidol.ac.th

Mahidol University International College (MUIC; Thai: วิทยาลัยนานาชาติ มหาวิทยาลัยมหิดล) is Thailand's first public international college. It is part of Mahidol University and is located on the university's Salaya Campus in Nakhon Pathom Province.

== History ==
The International Students Degree Program (ISDP) was founded in March 1986. It is the first international bachelor's degree program at a public university in Thailand. Six months later, the program accepted its first class of 45 students. The classes were taken on the second floor of the MU Social Science and Humanities Building. There were two full-time and 20 part-time instructors, a four-member support staff. The program offered a total of seven majors in the Sciences and Travel Industry Management.

In 1992, two additional majors namely Business Administration and Food Science and Technology were introduced and the program officially had its own new building which accommodates 486 students. Having been approved by the Mahidol University Council in 1996, ISDP was officially designated Mahidol University International College (MUIC). A six-storey complex was built two years later to accommodate more than a thousand of students along with a new management which include an expansion of academic offerings, additional internships, including the Salaya Pavilion Hotel and Training Center, a pre-college program and several offices. The college's academic, physical and social landscapes were developed over the years. There have been the promotion of student exchange program and a further expansion of its physical facilities including an eight-storey extension.

Now, MUIC offers a diverse range of 18 undergraduate majors and 24 minors in the Arts, Languages, Sciences, and Administration. Mahidol University International College also offered two master's degree programs, for approximately 3,200 students. The new building, Aditayathorn Building is completed in 2016. After its completion, MUIC is able to accommodate over 4,000 students.

== Academic Divisions ==
MUIC's graduate and undergraduate programs are administered by the academic divisions. Each division is responsible for their respective curriculum and faculty. Below are the list of divisions at MUIC.

- Business Administration
- Fine Arts
- Science
- Arts
- Arts and Science
- Management
- Communication Arts

== Admissions ==
Students have to pass entrance examinations and an interview in order to get into the college. There is an English examination that utilises TOEFL ITP exam questions for four sections - Grammar, Writing, Reading and Listening, with an "Essay Writing" examination in order to evaluate students' academic writing skills. As in 2021, MUIC has 2 tracks for students to apply to MUIC: "Regular Track" for students who do not have any test scores (English and/or Mathematics) or already have the scores, but it does not meet their criteria and "Fast Track" for those who have obtained at least 6.0 on both overall and writing for IELTS Academic, 69 overall and 22 for writing section of TOEFL iBT or Pearson PTE (Academic) with overall and writing scored 50. For Mathematics scores, prospective students can choose either SAT or ACT required only math scores (e.g. SAT Math at least 600 for BBA majors).

== Scholarships ==
Scholarships for high school potential students

1. ASEAN Students Scholarship.

MUIC offers a scholarship for ASEAN nationals (except Thais) who want to pursue their bachelor's degree at MUIC.

Qualifications

- Must be Southeast Asian nationals
- High school graduates
- Cum. GPA 3.00 or above
- Cum. GPA 3.00 or above while studying at MUIC
- Number of scholarship

8 scholarships a year Duration 4 years

Scholarship details

- Waiver of full tuition fees for 4 scholarship recipients
- Waiver of 50% of tuition fees for 4 scholarship recipients

2. MUIC Scholarship (Thai nationals)

This scholarship is awarded to potential students (Thai nationals) with limited finances resources who have completed Thai high school in Thailand and have achieved a cumulative 3.0 GPA or above for 5 terms in high school. The scholarship covers a tuition-fee waiver for 5 years, from PC to graduation. Four scholarships will be awarded every year for each of the four entrance examinations.

Criteria:

- Students who apply for any major
- They must pass MUIC's entrance examination
- Students must maintain a cumulative GPA of 2.50 or above in each trimester during the scholarship period
- Parent's combined income should not exceed 200,000 Baht/year
- Scholarship recipients are required to participate in MUIC activities

3. MUIC Scholarship for Science Majors This scholarship is awarded to potential students who have completed Thai high school in Thailand, although they do not necessarily have to be Thai nationals, and have achieved a cumulative 3.5 GPA or above for 5 terms in high school. The scholarship covers a tuition-fee waiver for 5 years, from PC to graduation. Four scholarships will be awarded every year for each of the four entrance examinations.

Criteria:

Students must apply for a Science Major

- They must pass MUIC's entrance examination in both mathematics and science with a score of 75% or above
- Students must maintain a cumulative GPA of 3.00 or above in each trimester during the scholarship period
- Scholarship recipients cannot change their major, unless it is within the Science Program

== Reputation ==
Mahidol University was one of the first universities in Thailand to offer liberal arts, international, English-based Bachelor programmes. The opportunity proved to be a success amongst Thai students looking for a leg up into studying further degrees abroad. Mahidol University, as a whole, has been ranked the best university in Thailand in various ranking methodologies. Although the international college is an autonomous element of the institution, it does not have its own academic ranking. However, the international college has benefited from the great availability resources, facilities, activities and teaching faculty provided by the university The college is said to be "one of the most successful international undergraduate degree programs in Thailand." It claims to hold a strong focus on liberal arts and "the promotion of a learning culture that prepares its students to meet the challenges of living and working in the 21st century." In 2010, MUIC received the Best Practice Award for its study abroad programs from the Commission on Higher Education, Ministry of Education, Thailand.

Mahidol University International College possesses strong extracurricular activities. It has a competitive Students in Free Enterprise (SIFE) programme which has won awards nationally. It has also a notably strong debate society. As of 2012, the debate club has won 6 out of 8 national debate titles at the annual championship - European Union-Thailand Intervarsity Debate Championships and regularly top the rankings of Thai universities at international debating competitions.

MUIC is one of only two higher education institutions (the other being with Chulalongkorn University's Sasin Graduate School) to have received the 'Thailand Trust Mark' from the Thai Ministry of Commerce, indicating the high quality educational services that the college provides.
