= Juan Cole =

American religious scholar (born 1952)

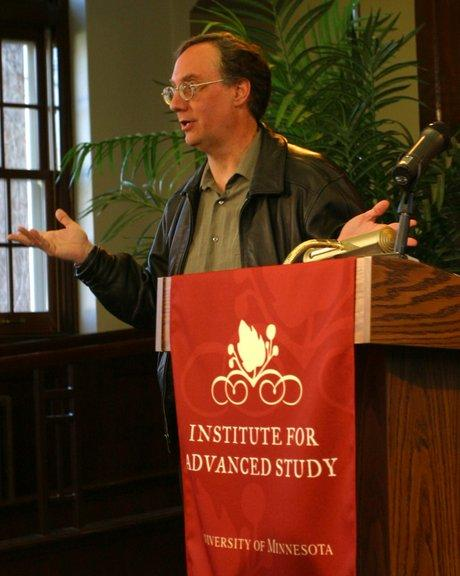
- Cole at the University of Minnesota in 2007.
- Born: John Ricardo Cole; October 23, 1952 (age 74); Albuquerque, New Mexico, U.S.
- Education: Northwestern University; The American University in Cairo; University of California, Los Angeles
- Occupation: Historian
- Spouse: Shahin Malik (m. 1982)
- Children: 1

John Ricardo Irfan "Juan" Cole (born October 23, 1952) is an American academic and commentator on the modern Middle East and South Asia. He is Richard P. Mitchell Distinguished University Professor of History at the University of Michigan.

Cole was one of the first American scholars to produce specialized works on the thought and history of the Twelver Shi'ite branch of Islam. His Sacred Space and Holy War (IB Tauris, 2002), was widely read as a primer on Shi'ism by Americans after the US invasion of Iraq. He wrote about Iraqi Shiism during and after the US occupation.

He has also contributed to theorizing Middle East revolutions, including the 1882 ʻUrabi revolt in Egypt, the 1979 Islamic Revolution in Iran, and the 2011–2013 Arab Spring. In recent years he has contributed to Quranic studies and the study of the origins of Islam, medieval Persian literature, and "Islamic Peace Studies." Since 2002, he has written a weblog, Informed Comment (juancole.com).

== Early life and education ==
Cole was born in Albuquerque, New Mexico, where his father—a United States Army Signal Corpsman—was stationed at Sandia Base. It was there that Cole fils acquired the nickname "Juan" (or "Juanito"). As a military family, the Coles would relocate many times, including lengthy stints in Paris, Fort Bragg, Orleans, Asmara (where Juan would first encounter Islam), and Falls Church, Virginia. He won a scholarship to Northwestern University, where he majored in history and religion. Northwestern is located near the Chicago (national) headquarters of the Baháʼí religion, which the Protestant-raised Cole joined in 1972, attracted by its progressive values. He would later (in 1996) resign from the religion, complaining of fundamentalist tendencies within its leadership. His plan to study at the American University of Beirut was interrupted by the Lebanese Civil War, with the eventual result that he transferred to the American University of Cairo, earning an MA in Arabic Studies in 1978. In 1984 he received a Ph.D. in Islamic Studies from UCLA, with a dissertation on the Shi'ite-ruled Kingdom of Awadh (1722–1856, now part of Uttar Pradesh). During field research, he met and (in 1982) married the attorney Shahin Malik in Lahore.

=== Appointments and awards ===
Cole was hired to teach modern Middle Eastern and South Asian history at the University of Michigan in 1984, rising through the ranks to become associate and then full professor. On October 16, 2025, the Regents of the University of Michigan approved the appointment of Cole as the Richard P. Mitchell Distinguished University Professor of History, effective September 1, 2025.

Cole was awarded Fulbright–Hays fellowships to India (1982) and to Egypt (1985–1986). In 1991 he held a National Endowment for the Humanities grant for the study of Shia Islam in Iran. From 1999 until 2004, Juan Cole was the editor of The International Journal of Middle East Studies. He has served in professional offices for the American Institute of Iranian Studies and on the editorial board of the journal Iranian Studies. He is a member of the Middle East Studies Association of North America, and served as the organization's president for 2006. In 2006, he received the James Aronson Award for Social Justice Journalism administered by Hunter College. He is a member of the Community Council of the National Iranian American Council (NIAC).

== Overview of major works ==
Of Roots of North Indian Shiism in Iran and Iraq, Duke University specialist in Islam Bruce Lawrence wrote, "One would be hard pressed to find a monograph on any aspect of South Asian Islam more extensively researched or carefully argued than this first book from Juan Cole. It is also boldly revisionist. Pace the title, the author concerns himself less with the external roots of North Indian Shi'ism than the internal development of a new Shi'i-oriented ideology among one segment of North Indian Muslim elites." He added that the book exceeded other works on this subject "In conceptual breadth and explanatory yield." -

With regard to Colonialism and Revolution in the Middle East, Timothy Mitchell, a New York University political scientist, called it an "impressive work of scholarship examines Egypt's social and cultural formation during the third quarter of the nineteenth century to uncover the causes of the 1881-82 revolution." He noted that the book was based on extensive primary sources in the Egyptian National Archives. He says the author's social-history approach allowed Cole to demonstrate that the movement was a revolution and not just a military coup. Cole focused on the intelligentsia, the merchants and artisans, and the landowning peasantry as the main revolutionary actors. Mitchell said that Cole drew on but went beyond Theda Skocpol's notion of conjunctural revolutions. -

Engaging the Muslim World (ISBN 0230607543) is a 2009 non-fiction book about the relationship between the United States and the Arab and Muslim worlds written by University of Michigan historian Juan Cole. His goal in writing the book, which is based on twentieth-century State Department archival documents and Arabic, Persian and Urdu primary sources, was to illustrate the true Muslim perspective towards the U.S. and explain why that has developed. The book recommends full engagement and diplomacy with all forms of Islam and criticizes the policy of preemptive military action, arguing that it should be used only as a last resort. The book blasts what it calls the Bush administration's "Islamophobic discourse."

Of Engaging the Muslim World prominent Middle East historian Ira Lapidus wrote, "Cole points out that Islam anxiety is fostered by a way of thinking that gives precedence to cultural and ideological conceptions of politics. Americans typically think in terms of race, ethnicity, religion, gender and ideology as defining political differences, but not in terms of political, economic and class interests. Indeed, it is almost taboo in American politics to raise the issue of class. Professor Cole, to the contrary, deals with national state issues precisely in terms of political, economic and social conflict."

Publisher's Weekly wrote of his 2014 The New Arabs: How the Millennial Generation is Changing the Middle East, " in this rousing study of the Arab Spring. University of Michigan historian Cole (Engaging the Muslim World) follows the revolutions in Tunisia, Egypt, and Libya from their roots in dissident organizing though the mass protests of 2011, the collapse of repressive regimes, and ensuing political turmoil. He focuses on the leadership of the “millennial” generation of young, urban, secular activists, their horizons broadened by the Internet and satellite TV, their “interactive networks and horizontal organizations” empowered by blogs and YouTube videos that spread ideas and rallied demonstrators. Cole’s exhilarating journalistic narrative of their exploits is enlivened by interviews with participants and his own colorful firsthand accounts of upheavals. His emphasis on youth and technology is sometimes overdone; revolution was for young firebrands as much in 1848 as in 2011, and old-fashioned factors—allegiances of soldiers, the humble paper pamphlet—play as important a role as youthful élan and social media. However, Cole’s deep, nuanced exploration of political and social currents underneath the uprisings shines; he shows Westerners who think the Arab world is divided between corrupt despots and Islamist zealots just how strong and pervasive the tendencies towards liberalism and democracy are. Agent: Brettne Bloom."

Cole founded the Global Americana Institute to translate works concerning the United States into Arabic. The first volume was selected works of Thomas Jefferson, and the second was a translation of a biography of Martin Luther King Jr. along with selected speeches and writings. The third was Fahrenheit 451 by Ray Bradbury

After September 11, 2001, Cole turned increasingly to writing on radical Muslim movements, the Iraq War, United States foreign policy, and the Iran crisis. He calls his work not "contemporary history" but "current affairs history:" "Blogging Current Affairs History," Journal of Contemporary History July 2011 vol. 46 no. 3 658-670

Cole testified on Iraq before the Senate Committee on Foreign Relations in 2004: "Juan Cole's Senate Testimony Brief," United States Senate Committee on Foreign Relations, April 20, 2004.

=== Informed Comment blog ===
Since 2002, Cole has published the blog Informed Comment, covering "History, Middle East, South Asia, Religious Studies, and the war on terror." Cole's prominence quickly rose through his blog, and Foreign Policy commented in 2004, "Cole's transformation into a public intellectual embodies many of the dynamics that have heightened the impact of the blogosphere. He wanted to publicize his expertise, and he did so by attracting attention from elite members of the blogosphere. As Cole made waves within the virtual world, others in the real world began to take notice."

In 2006, National Journal called Cole "the most respected voice on foreign policy on the left" and his blog ranked the 99th most popular in 2009, but it has since fallen off the list.

== Views ==
Leading up to the 2008 United States presidential election, Cole chastised several candidates, including Hillary Clinton, Rudy Giuliani, and Mitt Romney, for making bellicose statements about Iran in order to present themselves in a tougher or more conservative light.

In 2002, Cole rejected the Bush administration's early claims of Iraqi cooperation with Al-Qaeda by commenting that Saddam Hussein had "persecuted and killed both Sunni and Shiite fundamentalists in great number," as well as claims to the effect that Ba'athist Iraq was developing weapons of mass destruction. Rather than making America safer, he says, the war has ironically had the opposite effect: inspiring anti-U.S. militants.

In 2004, Cole pointed out that he was against boycotting Israeli professors: "I have stood with Israeli colleagues and against any attempt to marginalize them or boycott them."

In a 2005 speech at the Middle East Policy Council, Cole was critical of the U.S. allying itself with offshoots of the Islamic Dawa Party in the Iraq War but vehemently opposing Hezbollah in Lebanon.

According to Efraim Karsh, Cole has done "hardly any independent research on the twentieth-century Middle East" and characterized Cole's analysis of the era as "derivative." He has also responded to Cole's criticism of Israeli policies and the influence of the "Israel lobby" by comparing them to accusations that have been made in antisemitic writings. Cole replied directly to Karsh in his blog.

Jeremy Sapienza of Antiwar.com has criticized Cole for what he deems as partisan bias on issues of war and peace, citing his support for wars supported by the U.S. Democratic Party as the Yugoslav Wars and the 2011 military intervention in Libya, while opposing wars supported by the U.S. Republican Party such as the wars in Iraq.

=== Ahmadinejad's remarks on Israel ===
Cole and Christopher Hitchens traded barbs regarding the translation and meaning of a passage referring to Israel in a speech by Iran President Mahmoud Ahmadinejad. Fathi Nazila of The New York Times's Tehran bureau translated the passage as "Our dear Imam [Khomeini] said that the occupying regime must be wiped off the map."

In an article published at the Slate website, Hitchens accused Cole of attempting to minimize and distort the meaning of the speech, which Hitchens understood to be a repetition of "the standard line" that "the state of Israel is illegitimate and must be obliterated." Hitchens also denigrated Cole's competence in both Persian and "plain English" and described him as a Muslim apologist.

Cole responded that while he personally despised "everything Ahmadinejad stands for, not to mention the odious Khomeini," he objected to the New York Times translation. Cole wrote that it inaccurately suggested Ahmadinejad was advocating an invasion of Israel ("that he wants to play Hitler to Israel's Poland"). He added that a better translation of the phrase would be "the occupation regime over Jerusalem should vanish from the page of time," a metaphysical if not poetic reference rather than a militaristic one. He also stated that Hitchens was incompetent to assess a Persian-to-English translation, and accused him of unethically accessing private Cole e-mails from an on-line discussion group.

== Controversies ==
=== CIA harassment allegations ===
In 2011, James Risen reported in The New York Times that Glenn Carle, a former Central Intelligence Agency officer who was a top counterterrorism official during the administration of President George W. Bush, "said the White House at least twice asked intelligence officials to gather sensitive information" on Cole "in order to discredit him." "In an interview, Mr. Carle said his supervisor at the National Intelligence Council told him in 2005 that White House officials wanted 'to get' Professor Cole, and made clear that he wanted Mr. Carle to collect information about him, an effort Mr. Carle rebuffed. Months later, Mr. Carle said, he confronted a CIA official after learning of another attempt to collect information about Professor Cole. Mr. Carle said he contended at the time that such actions would have been unlawful."

=== Baháʼí studies ===
Cole converted to the Baháʼí Faith in 1972 and spent 25 years writing and travelling in support of the religion. He had several works published through Baháʼí publishers and co-edited an online journal (Occasional Papers in the Shaykhi, Babi, and Baha'i Religions). Some of these were unofficial translations, and two volumes by/about early Baháʼí theologian Mírzá Abu'l-Fadl.

In 1994, Cole participated in a discussion group that became a forum for dissent among Baháʼí academics against the Baháʼí administration. Cole was perceived as leading a dissident faction, and resigned his membership in 1996 after being confronted by Baháʼí leadership. He declared himself a Unitarian Universalist. Soon after his resignation, Cole created an email list and website called H-Bahai, which became a repository of both primary source material and critical analysis on the religion. Cole went on to attack the Baháʼí Faith in several books and articles written from 1998 to 2002, describe a prominent Baháʼí as "inquisitor" and "bigot," and accuse Baháʼí institutions of cult-like tendencies.

Cole's characterizations of Baháʼí institutions were contested by several scholars who are themselves Bahá’í, including specialists in Iranian studies and Baháʼí history, such as Moojan Momen, Amin Banani, Robert Stockman, and Nader Saiedi. Momen, writing in the academic journal Religion in 2007, argued that Cole's critique should be read not simply as disinterested academic evaluation, but in the context of what Momen characterized as an apostate career and exit narrative. Momen wrote that Cole's later papers reflected the standpoint of someone who had moved from the centre of the Baháʼí community to its margins, while Baháʼís who remained active in the community generally experienced the same institutions in the opposite way—as sources of "encouragement and guidance." Amin Banani, scholar of Persian literature, and Iranian studies (b. 1927, d. 2013), rejected the broader charge of institutional fundamentalism, writing that "no fair-minded person" could review the messages and pronouncements of the Universal House of Justice and find them "injudicious, literalist, anti-intellectual or fundamentalist." Stockman likewise raised methodological objections to Cole's analysis, arguing that it relied on limited and uneven sources and drew conclusions about institutional motives that the available evidence did not adequately support. Cole's later works on Baháʼí history and theology have also been critiqued by Saiedi.

=== Yale appointment controversy ===
In 2006, Cole was nominated to teach at Yale University and was approved by both Yale's sociology and history departments. However, the senior appointments committee overruled the departments, and Cole was not appointed.

According to "several Yale faculty members," the decision to overrule Cole's approval was "highly unusual." Yale Deputy Provost Charles Long stated that "Tenure appointments at Yale are very complicated and they go through several stages, and [the candidates] can fail to pass at any of the stages. Every year, at least one and often more fail at one of these levels, and that happened in this case." The history department vote was 13 in favor, seven opposed, and three abstentions. Professors interviewed by the Yale Daily News said "the faculty appeared sharply divided."

Yale historian Paula Hyman commented that the deep divisions in the appointment committee were the primary reasons that Cole was rejected: "There was also concern, aside from the process, about the nature of his blog and what it would be like to have a very divisive colleague." Yale political science professor Steven B. Smith commented, "It would be very comforting for Cole's supporters to think that this got steamrolled because of his controversial blog opinions. The blog opened people's eyes as to what was going on." Another Yale historian, John M. Merriman, said of Cole's rejection: "In this case, academic integrity clearly has been trumped by politics."

In an interview on Democracy Now!, Cole said that he had not applied for the post at Yale: "Some people at Yale asked if they could look at me for a senior appointment. I said, 'Look all you want.' So that's up to them. Senior professors are like baseball players. You're being looked at by other teams all the time. If it doesn't result in an offer, then nobody takes it seriously." He described the so-called "scandal" surrounding his nomination as "a tempest in a teapot" that had been exaggerated by "neo-con journalists": "Who knows what their hiring process is like, what things they were looking for?"

== Selected bibliography ==
=== Monographs and edited works ===
- Rethinking the Qur'an in Late Antiquity, De Gruyter, 2025 ISBN 978-3111342399
- Peace Movements in Islam: History, Religion and Politics, Editor and contributor. IB Tauris, 2021. ISBN 978-0755643202
- The Rubaiyat of Omar Khayyam: A New Translation with historical Afterword, IB Tauris, 2020. ISBN 978-0470601600
- Muhammad: Prophet of Peace amid the Clash of Empires, Bold Type Books / Hachette, 2018. ISBN 978-1568587837
- Global Connections: Politics, Exchange, and Social Life in World History, 2 vols. Cambridge University Press, 2015. [Co-Authors: John Coatsworth, Michael P. Hanagan, Peter C. Perdue, Charles Tilly & Louise Tilly]. ISBN 978-1316311301
- The New Arabs: How the Millennial Generation is Changing the Middle East, Simon and Schuster, 2014. ISBN 978-1451690415
- Engaging the Muslim World, Palgrave Macmillan, 2009. ISBN 0-230-60754-3
- Napoleon's Egypt: Invading the Middle East, Palgrave Macmillan, 2007. ISBN 1-4039-6431-9
- The Ayatollahs and Democracy in Iraq, Amsterdam University Press, 2006. ISBN 978-90-5356-889-7
- Nationalism and the Colonial Legacy in the Middle East and Central Asia. Co-edited with Deniz Kandiyoti. Special Issue of The International Journal of Middle East Studies Vol. 34, no. 2 (May 2002), pp. 187–424
- Sacred Space and Holy War: The Politics, Culture and History of Shi`ite Islam, London: I.B. Tauris, 2002. ISBN 1-86064-736-7
- Modernity and the Millennium:The Genesis of the Baháʼí Faith in the Nineteenth-Century Middle East. New York: Columbia University Press, 1998. ISBN 0-231-11081-2
- Colonialism and Revolution in the Middle East: Social and Cultural Origins of Egypt's `Urabi Movement. Princeton: Princeton University Press, 1993. Paperback edn., Cairo: American University in Cairo Press, 1999.
- Comparing Muslim Societies (edited, Comparative Studies in Society and History series); Ann Arbor: University of Michigan Press, 1992.
- Roots of North Indian Shi`ism in Iran and Iraq: Religion and State in Awadh, 1722–1859. Berkeley and Los Angeles: University of California Press, 1988; New Delhi: Oxford University Press, 1991)
- Shi'ism and Social Protest. (edited, with Nikki Keddie), New Haven: Yale University Press, 1986.

=== Selected recent journal articles and book chapters ===
- "Islamophobia and American Foreign Policy Rhetoric: The Bush Years and After." In John L. Esposito and Ibrahim Kalin, eds., Islamophobia: the Challenge of Pluralism in the 21st Century (Oxford: Oxford University Press, 2011), pp. 127–142.
- "Shi'ite Parties and the Democratic Process in Iraq." In Mary Ann Tetreault, Gwen Okruhlik, and Andrzej Kapiszewski, eds. Political Change in the Arab Gulf States: Stuck in Transition. (Boulder, Co.: Lynne Rienner Publishers, 2011). pp. 49–71.
- "Notes on 'Iran Today.' Michigan Quarterly Review. (Winter, 2010), pp. 49–55.
- "Playing Muslim: Bonaparte's Army of the Orient and Euro-Muslim Creolization." In David Armitage and Sanjay Subrahmaniyam, eds., The Age of Revolutions in Global Context, c. 1760–1840. (New York: Palgrave Macmillan, 2010), pp. 125–143.
- "Struggles over Personal Status and Family Laws in Post-Baathist Iraq." In Kenneth Cuno and Manisha Desai, eds., Family, Gender and Law in a Globalizing Middle East and South Asia (Syracuse: Syracuse University Press, 2009), pp. 105–125.
- "Iraq and the Israeli-Palestinian Conflict in the Twentieth Century." Macalester International, Volume 23 (Spring 2009): 3–23.
- "The Taliban, Women and the Hegelian Private Sphere," in Robert D. Crews and Amin Tarzi, The Taliban and the Crisis of Afghanistan (Cambridge, Mass.: Harvard University Press, 2008), pp. 118–154 (revised version of Social Research article below.)
- "Islamophobia and American Foreign Policy" Islamophobia and the Challenges of Pluralism in the 21st Century, (Washington, D.C.: ACMCU Occasional Papers, Georgetown University, 2008). Pp. 70–79.
- "Marsh Arab Rebellion: Grievance, Mafias and Militias in Iraq," Fourth Wadie Jwaideh Memorial Lecture, (Bloomington, IN: Department of Near Eastern Languages and Cultures, Indiana University, 2008). pp. 1–31.
- "The Decline of Grand Ayatollah Sistani's Influence." Die Friedens-Warte: Journal of International Peace and Organization. Vol. 82, nos.2–3 (2007): 67–83.
- "Shia Militias in Iraqi Politics." In Markus Bouillon, David M. Malone and Ben Rowswell, eds., Iraq: Preventing a New Generation of Conflict (Boulder, Co.: Lynne Rienner, 2007), pp. 109–123.
- "Anti-Americanism: It's the Policies." AHR Forum : Historical Perspectives on Anti-Americanism. The American Historical Review, 111 (October, 2006): 1120–1129.
- "The Rise of Religious and Ethnic Mass Politics in Iraq," in David Little and Donald K. Swearer, eds., Religion and Nationalism in Iraq: A Comparative Perspective (Cambridge, Mass.: Center for the Study of the World Religions/ Harvard University Press, 2006), pp. 43–62.
- "Muslim Religious Extremism in Egypt: A Historiographical Critique of Narratives," in Israel Gershoni, et al., eds. Middle East Historiographies: Narrating the Twentieth Century (Seattle: University of Washington Press, 2006), pp. 262–287.
- "Of Crowds and Empires: Afro-Asian Riots and European Expansion, 1857–1882." [Extensively revised.] In Fernando Coronil and Julie Skurski, eds. States of Violence. Ann Arbor: University of Michigan Press, 2006, pp. 269–305.
- "Empires of Liberty? Democracy and Conquest in French Egypt, British Egypt and American Iraq." In Lessons of Empire: Imperial Histories and American Power. Ed. Calhoun, Craig, Frederick Cooper and Kevin W. Moore, eds. New York: The New Press, 2006. pp. 94–115. .
- "A 'Shiite Crescent'? The Regional Impact of the Iraq War." Current History. (January 2006): 20–26.
- Juan Cole et al., "A Shia Crescent: What Fallout for the U.S.?" Middle East Policy Volume XII, Winter 2005, Number 4, pp. 1–27. (Joint oral round table).
- "The United States and Shi'ite Religious Factions in Post-Ba'thist Iraq," The Middle East Journal, Volume 57, Number 4, Autumn 2003, pp. 543–566.
- "The Imagined Embrace: Gender, Identity and Iranian Ethnicity in Jahangiri Paintings." In Michel Mazzaoui, ed. Safavid Iran and her Neighbors (Salt Lake City: Utah University Press, 2003), pp. 49–62.
- "Mad Sufis and Civic Courtesans: The French Republican Construction of Eighteenth-Century Egypt." In Irene Bierman, ed. Napoleon in Egypt. (London: Ithaca Press, 2003), pp. 47–62.
- "Al-Tahtawi on Poverty and Welfare," in Michael Bonner, Mine Ener and Amy Singer, eds. Poverty and Charity in Middle Eastern Contexts (Albany, NY: State University of New York Press, 2003), pp. 223–238.

=== Translations ===
- Religion in Iran: From Zoroaster to Baha'u'llah by Alessandro Bausani. [Editor of this English translation of Persia Religiosa, Milan, 1958, and contributor of afterwords and bibliographical updates]. New York: Bibliotheca Persica Press, 2000.
- Broken Wings: A Novel by Kahlil Gibran. [Translation of the Arabic novel, al-Ajnihah al-Mutakassirah.] Ashland, Or.: White Cloud Press, 1998)
- The Vision [ar-Ru'ya] of Kahlil Gibran [prose poems translated from the Arabic]. Harmondsworth: Penguin, 1998. [Hardcover Edn.: Ashland, Or.: White Cloud Press, 1994)
- Spirit Brides [`Ara'is al-muruj] of Kahlil Gibran [short stories translated from the Arabic]. Santa Cruz: White Cloud Press, 1993.
- Letters and Essays 1886–1913 (Rasa'il va Raqa'im) of Mírzá Abu'l-Fadl Gulpaygani [tr. from Arabic and Persian]. Los Angeles: Kalimat Press, 1985.
- Miracles and Metaphors (Ad-Durar al-bahiyyah) of Mírzá Abu'l-Fadl Gulpaygani [tr. from the Arabic and annotated]. Los Angeles: Kalimat Press, 1982)
