= Lataif-e-Sitta =

Special organs of perception in Sufi spiritual psychology

The Laṭāʾif (Arabic: اللطائف) are subtle organs of spiritual and psycho-physiological functioning in Sufi psychology.

Depending on context, the Laṭāʾif are also understood to be the experiential qualities or forms of those functions. (See "Disambiguation: Laṭā’if (organs) or Laṭā’if (experiences)").

The Arabic word Laṭīfa (singular of Laṭāʾif) means “subtlety” and the phrase Laṭā’if-e-sitta means “six subtleties”.

They are viewed as aspects of Man's spiritual “Organ of Evolution”, known as Qalb (Heart) (See "Disambiguation: Qalb (Heart) or Qalb (Laṭīfa)").

Explicit realization of the Laṭāʾif in Qalb is considered by some Sufi orders—especially the Naqshbandi—to be a central part of the comprehensive spiritual development that produces the Sufi ideal of a Complete Human Being (Al-Insān al-Kāmil).

== Different understandings of the Laṭāʾif ==
Not all Sufi orders teach about the Laṭā’if. Of those which do, descriptions of their number, associated bodily locations, and associated colors can differ depending on the specific Sufi lineage and exponent representing it.

Individual Sufi teachers (see Sheikh (Sufism)), for example, sometimes understand aspects of Laṭā’if theory and practice according to how the Laṭāʾif have been uniquely revealed to them.

And modern day neuro-science research suggests that brain lateralization might also contribute to differences. If, for example, a foundational teacher of a specific Sufi order is left-handed, his internal "map" of the Laṭā’if might mirror that of a right-handed teacher, leading to a difference in how that lineage understands their locations.

In general, there are three major historical understandings of the Laṭāʾif:

- (13th century) The Kubrāwī order, exemplified by Ala ud-Daula Simnani (1261–1336), views the Laṭāʾif as potential psychospiritual organs/capacities that can be realized as progressive stages in those undergoing spiritual development;
- (17th century) The Mujaddidī branch of the Naqshbandi order, exemplified by Ahmad Sirhindi (1564–1624), views the Laṭāʾif as actual psychospiritual organs/capacities that are potential receptors of Divine energy when activated in those undergoing spiritual development;
- (20th century) The Punjab tradition within the Naqshbandi order, exemplified by Idries Shah (1924–1996), views the Laṭāʾif as actual human psycho-physiological organs/capacities that are usually implicit in everyday life but can be made explicit in those undergoing spiritual development.

=== Kubrāwī Laṭā’if (13th century) ===
According to the view of the Kubrawi Order there are seven Laṭā’if. They are understood cosmologically as vertical (or concentric) levels through which reality is created and structured.

In the process of spiritual development, the Sufi student is understood to move upward (or inward) through these levels progressively (see ontological Arcs of Descent and Ascent in Sufism). The attainment of each level is associated with the activation/realization of a corresponding spiritual organ/capacity, interpreted symbolically through Islamic cosmology and the prophets and messengers in Islam.

In ascending (lower to higher) or centripetal (outer to inner) order they are:

The lower level (or outer form):

- Qalab (associated with an experience of the color gray) represents the acquisition of a new organ, an embryonic subtle body. It is understood symbolically as “the Adam of one’s being”, since Adam was the first human being.
- Nafs (color blue) is an organ that corresponds to the animal soul. It is understood symbolically as “the Noah of one’s being”.

The intermediate level:

- Qalb (color red) is an organ that can develop to become the True Ego, the real personal individuality. It is understood symbolically as “the Abraham of one’s being”.
- Sirr (color white) is an organ of superconsciousness. It is understood symbolically as “the Moses of one’s being”.
- Ruḥ (color yellow) is an organ through which an individual becomes capable of acting as vice-regent of God. It is understood symbolically as “the David of one’s being”.

The transcendent level (or deepest inner core):

- Khafī (color black) is the subtle organ that receives spiritual inspiration. It is understood symbolically as “the Jesus of one’s being".
- Ḥaqq (color green) is the subtle organ that is the final achievement of spiritual development: the True Ego. It is understood symbolically as “the Muḥammad of one’s being”, since Muḥammad was the ultimate prophet.

=== Naqshbandi Laṭāʾif (Mujaddidī) (17th century) ===
According to the view of the Mujaddidī branch of the Naqshbandi order there are five Laṭāʾif. The reception of each Laṭīfa’s “spiritual energy” from its corresponding cosmic realm is interpreted symbolically through the prophets and messengers in Islam, similar to the interpretation of the Kubrawi order:

- Qalb (color yellow; located below left breast) (Adam)
- Ruḥ (color red; located below right breast) (Abraham/Noah)
- Sirr (color white; located above left breast) (Moses)
- Khafi (color black; located above right breast) (Jesus)
- Ikhfa (color green; located at sternum) (Muḥammad)

In this understanding, the Laṭāʾif all have their physical association in the chest and so are said to be “of the Heart” (Qalb, the potential human “Organ of Evolution”—see "Disambiguation: Qalb (Heart) or Qalb (Laṭīfa)").

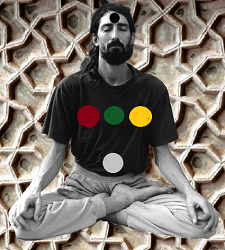
Colors and associated physical locations of the Laṭāʾif according to the Naqshbandi (Punjab) Sufi tradition.

=== Naqshbandi Laṭāʾif (Punjab tradition) (20th century) ===
According to the Punjab tradition within the Naqshbandi order, which emphasizes modern-day psychological aspects of Sufism, there are five Laṭāʾif:

- Qalb (color yellow; experienced in left side of the body)
- Ruḥ (color red; experienced in right side of the body)
- Sirr (color white; experienced in solar plexus)
- Khafi (color black; experienced in forehead)
- Ikhfa (color green; experienced in center of chest)

In this tradition the Laṭāʾif are understood to be spiritual organs/capacities that also underlie ordinary forms of human psycho-physiological functioning.

=== Comparison of understandings of the Laṭāʾif ===
Laṭīfa	Sufi Tradition	Color Association	Physical Association	Note
Qalb	Kubrawi (1)	Red	left breast	Kubrawi:
Qalb	Naqshbandi (Mujaddidi) (1)	Yellow	below left breast	Mujaddidi:
Qalb	Naqshbandi (Awaisi) (1)	Red	below left breast	Awaisi:
Qalb	Naqshbandi (Punjab) (1)	Yellow	left side of body	Punjab:
Qalb	Chishti (1)	Red	left breast	Chisti:
Qalb	Inayati (1)	Red	left breast	Inayati:
Qalb	Khwajagan (1)	Red	left breast	Khwajagan:
Qalb	Burhani (1)	Yellow	below left breast	Burhani:
Qalb	Azeemia (1)	(?)	left breast	Azeemia:
Ruḥ	Kubrawi (2)	Yellow	within Qalb	
Ruḥ	Naqshbandi (Mujaddidi) (2)	Red	below right breast	
Ruḥ	Naqshbandi (Awaisi) (2)	Yellow	below right breast	
Ruḥ	Naqshbandi (Punjab) (2)	Red	right side of body	
Ruḥ	Chishti (2)	Green	center of chest	
Ruḥ	Inayati (2)	White	right breast	
Ruḥ	Khwajagan (2)	Yellow	right breast	
Ruḥ	Burhani (2)	Red	below right breast	
Ruḥ	Azeemia (2)	(?)	right breast	
Sirr	Kubrawi (3)	White	center of chest	
Sirr	Naqshbandi (Mujaddidi) (3)	White	above left breast	
Sirr	Naqshbandi (Awaisi) (3)	Blue	above left breast	
Sirr	Naqshbandi (Punjab) (3)	White	solar plexus	
Sirr	Chishti (3)	White	right breast	
Sirr	Inayati (3)	Green	center of chest	
Sirr	Khwajagan (3)	White	left breast	
Sirr	Burhani (3)	Green	center of chest	
Sirr	Azeemia (3)	(?)	center of chest	
Khafi	Kubrawi (4)	Black/Green	within Ruḥ	
Khafi	Naqshbandi (Mujaddidi) (4)	Black	above right breast	
Khafi	Naqshbandi (Awaisi) (4)	White	above right breast	
Khafi	Naqshbandi (Punjab) (4)	Black	forehead	
Khafi	Chishti (4)	Indigo	forehead	
Khafi	Inayati (4)	Indigo	forehead	
Khafi	Khwajagan (4)	Green	right breast	
Khafi	Burhani (4)	White	forehead	
Khafi	Azeemia (4)	(?)	forehead	
Ikhfa	Naqshbandi (Mujaddidi) (5)	Green	sternum	
Ikhfa	Naqshbandi (Awaisi) (5)	Green	sternum	
Ikhfa	Naqshbandi (Punjab) (5)	Green	center of chest	
Ikhfa	Chisti (5)	Black	top of head	
Ikhfa	Inayati (5)	Black	top of head	
Ikhfa	Khwajagan (5)	White	center of chest	
Ikhfa	Burhani (5)	Black	top of head	
Ikhfa	Azeemia (5)	(?)	top of head	
Nafs	Kubrawi (5)	Blue	below navel	see "Disambiguation: Nafs (Egoic Self) or Laṭīfa"
Nafs	Chishti (6)	Yellow	below navel	"
Nafs	Inayati (6)	Yellow	below navel	"
Nafs	Khwajagan (6)	Blue	forehead	"
Nafs	Naqshbandi (Awaisi) (6)	colorless	forehead	"
Nafs	Azeemia (6)	(?)	below navel	"
Qalab	Kubrawi (6)	Gray	entire body	see "Disambiguation: Qalab or Sultan al-Azkar"
Qalab	Chishti (7)	Gray	floor of pelvis	"
Qalab	Naqshbandi (Awaisi) (7)	colorless	entire body	"
Haqq	Kubrawi (7)	Green	within Khafi	
Ana	(?)	White	center of chest	
Ana	Junaidi	colorless	forehead	

== Spiritual development and the Laṭāʾif ==
For Sufi traditions that teach the Laṭāʾif, spiritual development is undertaken on two dimensions:

- refinement of the egoic, psycho-physiological "self", known as "Nafs"
- activation (actualization/realization/opening/awakening/energizing/illumination (tajalli)) of the Laṭāʾif.

The egoic Self is said to proceed through seven stages of development, the primitive stages of which distort or "veil" (see Hijab (Sufism)) full realization of the Laṭā’if. In most Sufi traditions, accordingly, a general, progressive refinement of the Nafs precedes any explicit activation of the Laṭā’if.

In the Naqshbandi tradition, however, it is the reverse: the activation of specific Laṭāʾif is used to facilitate refinement of the Nafs. This is why the Naqshbandi teaching method is known as "where others end, there marks our beginning" ("indiraj al-nihayat fi’l-bidayat").

See also: "Disambiguation: Nafs (Egoic Self) or Nafs (Laṭīfa)".

== Activation of the Laṭāʾif ==
Just as interpretations of the Laṭāʾif vary, their activation also consists of various methods, singly or in combination, such as:

- Tawajjuh (“attention”): intentional transmission of the Laṭīfa directly from teacher to student.
- Dhikr (“remembrance"): recitation of a Quranic phrase accompanied by postures, breathing, and movement
- Muraqabah (“watching”): persistent awareness directed to the part of the body associated with the Laṭīfa

=== Kubrawi ===
In the Kubrawi tradition, Sufi Ala ud-Daula Simnani (1261–1336) describes a dhikr type practice that involved certain postures, the rotation of attention and breath to different parts of the physical body, and the recitation of a Quranic credal formula.

"The ideal formula for recollection is the credal statement: 'There is no god but God' ['La illaha il’allah']. This formula should be uttered in four beats: (i) With all his strength, the mystic should exhale the 'la' from above the navel. (ii) He should then inhale the 'ilaha' to the right side of the breast, (iii) then exhale the 'illa' from the right side to the left, (iv) and then inhale the 'Allah' to the physical heart . . . which is on the left side of the breast."

=== Khwajagan ===
In the Khwajagan tradition, Rif‘at Bey describes a visualization practice at the physical location associated with a Laṭīfa:

"The seeker represents to himself the Exalted Name – that is, the noble name of Allah – written in letters of light under the nipple of his left breast. Holding his attention upon the meaning and significance of the Exalted Name, he begins to repeat it silently. He continues to do so until he sees a red light surrounding it."

=== Naqshbandi (Mujaddidī) ===
In the Mujaddidī tradition, the Laṭāʾif are opened through practice one-by-one in “ascending” order, beginning with Qalb. Viewed as a progressive activation, each Laṭīfa (or progressive combination of Laṭāʾif) is considered to be a level of spiritual realization.

The method of opening each Laṭīfa typically begins with a direct transmission of Barakah (spiritual Presence) by teacher to student, and can also include physical touch (except for women) and the disclosure of a specific one of the Divine Names of God in Islam:

"In the Naqshbandi order typically the shaikh first bestows baraka at the time of initiation (bay‘a) by placing his four fingers on the heart and pronouncing the name “Allah” three times."

The student then continues the practice by silent dhikr of the Name, concentrating attention on the Laṭīfa’s location; sometimes a visualization of the Name, the corresponding prophet, or the teacher is also added.

=== Naqshbandi (Awaisi) ===
In the Awaisi tradition, the Laṭāʾif are illuminated through a dhikr cycle that begins with Qalb and continues with the other six Laṭāʾif in order. The student inhales vigorously into the Qalb(Heart) with a silent, attentive “Allah” and exhales out to the specific Laṭīfa with a silent, attentive “Hu”:

"Our Zikr method is very simple, every ingress takes the word Allah inside and every egress brings out Hu to strike the Latifah under Zikr, while vigorous and fast breathing generates heat in the body."

(See also: corresponding video in "External Links").

=== Naqshbandi (Punjab) ===
In the Punjab tradition, Idries Shah describes a type of muraqabah in which the student concentrates awareness on the part of the body that is associated with a Laṭīfa:

"The method, presided over by the instructor (Sheikh), is to concentrate the consciousness upon certain areas of the body and head, each area being linked with the Laṭīfa faculties."

== Direct experiences of the Laṭāʾif ==
With rare exceptions, direct and explicit experiences of the Laṭāʾif only arise in human beings who have undergone a spiritual evolution. These experiences can be of several different types, singly or in combination, among them:

- “Visual” experiences
- “Tactile” experiences

=== Kubrawi ===
In Persian Sufi Illuminationism (see: Najm al-Din Kubra), all creation is a successive outflow from the original Supreme Light of Lights (Nur al-Anwar) (see: Nūr (Islam)). The cosmology of this tradition is a kind of Emanationism in which immaterial Light descends from the Light of Lights in ever-diminishing intensity. In other words, Creation at all levels of its existence—including that of the Laṭāʾif—is made up of varying degrees of Light.

Accordingly, the experiences of the Laṭāʾif are both an external “visual” experience of photisms (“acts of light”) and a tactile inner sensation, as described by Henry Corbin.

=== Khwajagan ===
The Laṭāʾif are experienced primarily as colors seen surrounding the name of Allah at the physical location associated with each Laṭīfa, as described by Rifa‘t Bey.

Tactile experience of the Ruḥ Laṭīfa according to the Naqshbandi (Punjab) Sufi tradition.

=== Naqshbandi (Punjab) ===
Direct and explicit realizations of the Laṭāʾif are experienced primarily as differentiated, localized forms of an overall tactile spiritual Presence (“Ḥuḍur”) in the body, as described by Naqshbandi influenced spiritual teacher Hameed Ali (A. H. Almaas) (1944–):

"[Presence] is an embodied existence and will be experienced in the body, not somewhere else or abstractly . . . By awakening the body and refining its sensitivity the deeper and subtler capacities of perception are awakened and developed".

== Indirect experiences of the Laṭāʾif ==
Beyond direct and explicit experiences of the Laṭāʾif, Sufi traditions can differ in their understanding of how the Laṭāʾif affect human experience indirectly and implicitly.

=== Kubrawi ===
In traditions similar to the Kubrawi, for example, the Laṭāʾif are only activated after the Nafs has been refined by other means.

As a result, the experiences of the Laṭāʾif are viewed as higher/inner spiritual capacities and virtues that are unrelated to the conventional experiences and capacities of the lower/outer egoic Self (Nafs).

=== Naqshbandi ===
In traditions similar to the Naqshbandi, however, the process of activating the Laṭāʾif is understood to itself contribute to the refinement of the Nafs. This refinement is experienced both as a reduction in specific personality flaws and an increase in corresponding virtues.

Such changes in the egoic Self can therefore be understood as indirect, secondary effects of the (partially or wholly) activated Laṭāʾif.

The activation of the Ruḥ Laṭīfa, for example, is often connected with overcoming personal weakness and anger and replacing it with healthy strength and assertiveness.

=== Naqshbandi (Punjab) ===
Finally, traditions similar to the Naqshbandi (Punjab) understand the Laṭāʾif to be spiritual organs/capacities that also underlie ordinary forms of human psycho-physiological functioning.

As such, they are thought to be activated and operating implicitly at all times and appear indirectly through the corresponding experiences that they pattern on the conventional mental/emotional/somatic level of the egoic Self.

Hameed Ali understands some of these Laṭāʾif and psycho-physiological correspondences as follows:

- Qalb (Enjoyment)
- Ruḥ (Vitality)
- Sirr (Confidence)
- Khafi (Stillness)
- Ikhfa (Sensitivity)

== Disambiguation of the Laṭāʾif ==
Even among traditions that recognize the Laṭāʾif, Sufi teachings often include other features or terminology that have ambiguous relationships to the Laṭāʾif.

In addition, there is perennial potential for ambiguity in discussing the Laṭāʾif (both in primary sources and in their English translation) arising from the way that words in Arabic can have different meanings in different contexts.

Similar examples in English include the literal and figurative meanings of the word "heart":

- a physical organ in humans and animals ("a heart beat")
- a generous disposition toward others ("a person with a big heart")
- courage ("never lose heart")
- the most vital part of a thing ("the heart of the city").

=== Arabic, Quranic, or Sufi meaning of Laṭāʾif ===
The word Laṭāʾif is the plural of the transliterated Arabic word Laṭīfa, from the tripartite verb la-ṭa-fa, which means “to be subtle”.

It assumed a spiritual meaning in the Qur’an where Al-Laṭīf is one of the 99 names of God in Islam, reflecting His subtle nature.

And it was subsequently adopted by Sufism to refer to various aspects of reality that are not gross, material qualities of the physical world (see, for example, "Disambiguation: Ten, five, or six Laṭāʾif").

=== Transliteration or translation or interpretation of the Laṭāʾif ===
English language authors use one or more of three methods when referring to specific Laṭā’if:

- a transliteration of the Arabic word associated with the Laṭīfa
- a translation of the word's general Arabic meaning
- an interpretation of the corresponding experience that is the word's specific Sufi meaning.

Laleh Bahktiar uses both a transliteration and a translation:

- Laṭā’if (“Subtle [Organs]”)
- Qalabīya (“Mold”)
- Nafsīya (“Soul”)
- Qalbīya (“Heart”)
- Sirrīya (“Secret”)
- Ruḥīya (“Spirit”)
- Khafīya (“Inspiration”)
- Haqqīya (“Seal”)

Idries Shah also uses both a transliteration and a translation:

- Laṭā’if (“[Five] Subtleties”)
- Qalb (“Mind”)
- Ruḥ (“Spirit”)
- Sirr (“Consciousness”)
- Khafi (“Intuition”)
- Ikhfa (“Deep perception of Consciousness”)

Hameed Ali uses a transliteration and an interpretation:

- Laṭā’if
- Qalb (“Joy”)
- Ruḥ (“Strength”)
- Sirr (“Will”)
- Khafi (“Peace”)
- Ikhfa (“Compassion”)

=== Laṭā’if (organs) or Laṭā’if (experiences) ===
The Laṭā’if can be understood in two inter-related ways:

- as "organs", referring to psycho-spiritual faculties or centers within a human being
- as "experiences", referring to the qualities or forms of experience when those organs are functioning.

The organs are spiritual structures or potentials . . . and the experiences are the phenomenological realization of those potentials. The organs are conceptualized as the means through which the experiences arise.

=== Ten, five, or six Laṭāʾif ===
In the version of Sufi cosmology proposed by Ahmad Sirhindi (1564–1624), God created the universe in three stages:

- First came the “World of God's Command” (alam al-amr), which emerged instantly when God said, "Be!" The five subtle qualities (Laṭāʾif) of God's Command were: Qalb, Ruḥ, Sirr, Khafi, and Ikhfa.
- Then came the “World of God's Creation” (alam al-khalq), which emerged through a process of evolution. The five subtle qualities (Laṭāʾif) which patterned that Creation were: Consciousness (Nafs), Air (Baad), Fire (Nar), Water (Ma), and Earth (Khak).
- Finally, God created human beings, which combined the “World of God’s Command” with the “World of God's Creation”.

In this usage, then, there are ten Laṭā’if in two categories:

- five relating to the “World of God’s Command” and
- five relating to the “World of God’s Creation”.

In contrast, in most Sufi usages outside this cosmological one (including most of this webpage), there are either:

- five Laṭāʾif (from the first category alone, the “World of God's Command”) or
- six Laṭāʾif (the five from the first category . . . plus Nafs from the second category, the “World of God’s Creation”).

=== Nafs (Egoic Self) or Nafs (Laṭīfa) ===
The Nafs in Sufism is considered to be a person's egoic consciousness or egoic, psycho-physiological "Self". It is the subtle (Laṭīfa) quality of "God's Creation" that becomes individual and can undergo a spiritual development. This makes it unlike the five Laṭā’if of "God's Command", which are transcendent, unchanging qualities.

=== Laṭāʾif and the number "Seven" ===
The number "seven" appears repeatedly in Islam and in Sufism, to reflect relationships between entities within various categories.

In Islam, "seven" appears in the Quran, in the Hajj pilgrimage, and in the "Seven Heavens", among others. In Sufism, it appears in seven Laṭāʾif, seven stages of Nafs development, and seven Maqamat.

In some cases this use of "seven" is understood literally . . . while in other cases it is understood to be a metaphor for an "infinite" or "complete" number of entities.

Additionally, there is not always a consensus about correlating one category of seven things with another.

For example, Ala ud-Daula Simnani explicitly correlates the seven progressive Laṭāʾif with the seven ontological levels of Islamic cosmology, whereas other Sufi orders, which recognize only five Laṭāʾif, do not.

=== Inter-relationship of Laṭāʾif ===
Most Sufi traditions arrange the individual Laṭāʾif in some specific order.

For example, the Laṭīfa Qalb is often given first priority because its activation is the student's first orientation to the related presence and importance of Qalb (Heart) -- Man's spiritual "Organ of Evolution".

In the Kubrawi tradition, the Laṭāʾif are understood to reflect the hierarchy of successive historical prophets and messengers, beginning with Adam and culminating with Muhammad. The student's spiritual development is thought to unfold from an earlier, more limited revelation to a later, more complete one.

In the Naqshbanbdi (Mujaddidi) tradition, the realization of the Laṭāʾif is sometimes understood to be not only progressive but also cumulative; each new Laṭīfa's realization is a comprehensive combination of that Laṭīfa and all previously realized Laṭāʾif.

Finally, in those traditions that emphasize modern day psychological aspects of Sufism, the order of activation of the Laṭāʾif is sometimes determined by the individual student's personal history. A student might, for example, have one or another Laṭīfa that is less "veiled" than another, in which case it could be the first Laṭīfa emphasized for activation.

=== Ruḥ (Spirit) or Ruḥ (Laṭīfa) ===
The word "Ruḥ" is used in Sufism in two different ways, on two different levels:

- "Ruḥ", as one of the Laṭā’if described in the foregoing
- "Ruh" (Spirit), as the Divine Spirit or “essence” in human beings, created by God from his own Spirit.

=== Qalb (Heart) or Qalb (Laṭīfa) ===
The word “Qalb”, like “Ruḥ”, is used in Sufism in two different ways, on two different levels:

- “Qalb”, as one of the Laṭāʾif described in the foregoing
- "Qalb" (Heart), as the “Organ of Evolution” in human beings, the potential integration of Ruḥ (the Divine Spirit) and Nafs (the egoic Self).

=== Sirr (Secret) or Sirr (Laṭā’if) ===
The word "Sirr", like "Ruḥ" and "Qalb", is also used in Sufism in two different ways, on two different levels:

- “Sirr”, as one of the Laṭā’if described in the foregoing
- “Sirr” (“Secret”), as a super-conscious state of Qalb (Heart) or Ruḥ (Spirit) experienced as unity with God.

=== Laṭāʾif and the Jism Laṭīf ===
The realization of the Laṭāʾif in Qalb (Heart) is understood by Sufism to also represent the potential development of a corresponding subtle body in human beings, known in some traditions as the "Jism Laṭīf".

The Jism Laṭīf is the underlying spiritual substance and persistent spiritual Presence (“Ḥuḍur”) possible for humans.

It is said to exist in one of ten forms, corresponding to the level of spiritual development an individual has undergone in life. As such, it is also the corresponding level at which a human being survives physical death.

See also: "Disambiguation: Qalab or Sultan al-Azkar".

=== Qalab or Sultan al-Azkar ===
The Laṭīfa named “Qalab” in the Kubrawi tradition is similar to the Laṭīfa named “Sulṭan al-Azkar” (“King of Zikrs”) in the Naqshbandi (Awaisi) tradition. Traditions that recognize this Laṭīfa consider its realization to be the realization of a subtle body. (See also "Disambiguation: Laṭāʾif and the Jism Latif").

Some (like the Kubrawi) consider Qalab to be a preliminary realization of the subtle body and therefore the first Laṭīfa to be activated in spiritual practise. In this perspective, the realization of subsequent Laṭāʾif is considered to be a development, refinement, or differentiation of the subtle body.

Other traditions (like the Awaisi) consider Sultan al-Azkar to be a comprehensive realization of the subtle body and therefore the final Laṭīfa to be activated in practise. In this perspective, the subtle body is considered to be a unification and integration of previously realized Laṭāʾif.

=== Ḥal (State), Maqam (Station), or Laṭīfa ===
In addition to the Laṭāʾif, some Sufi traditions also speak about two other categories of conscious experience that can arise during spiritual practice:

- “Ḥal” (State), is a temporary altered state of consciousness arising from psychological or spiritual influences acting upon a student. They are considered to be gifts from God that arise in experience and then disappear, usually immediately.
- “Maqam” (Station or Stage), is one of seven permanent stages of a Sufi's spiritual development/embodiment/transformation achieved by his own effort.

Although indirect experiences of the Laṭā’if (see corresponding section above) could be interpreted as being Ḥal states . . . and direct experiences of the Laṭā’if (see corresponding section above) could be interpreted as being Maqam stations . . . there appears to be no consensus for such an interpretation.

=== Divine Names or Laṭāʾif ===
The Divine Names of God in Islam are understood to refer to the relational action, functioning, or appearance of transcendental Divine Attributes in manifest reality, having ontological, epistemological, and self-realization aspects.

Conceptualized ontologically, for example, the Divine Names stand for the relationship between the source of manifestation and the manifestations themselves:

“The reality (ḥaqȋqa) of the universe and all beings is based on the Divine Names. The reality of every being is based on one Name or on many.”

And while the Laṭāʾif can likewise be conceptualized ontologically (see: "Disambiguation: Ten, five, or six Laṭāʾif"), there appears to be no consensus about how their ontological, epistemological, and self-realization aspects are related to those of the Divine Names.

== The Laṭāʾif outside Sufism ==
In addition to Sufism itself, the Laṭāʾif are also found in certain spiritual teachings whose founders have been influenced by Sufism.

=== The Fourth Way ===
The Fourth Way is an approach to human self-development introduced to Europe in the early 20th century by George Gurdjieff (1867-1949) and his student P.D. Ouspensky (1878-1947). Substantial parts of the teaching are thought to be derived from Naqshbandi Sufism.

For example, there are said to be seven Centers (Fourth Way) within human beings that organise specific functions:

- Five “lower” centers: the "Intellectual", "Emotional", "Moving", "Instinctive", and "Sexual", which are understood to operate explicitly in humans from birth.
- Two “higher” centers: the "Higher Emotional" and "Higher Intellectual", which are understood to operate implicitly in humans but which can become explicit in those who undergo a spiritual development.

In this teaching, the Higher Emotional Center is equivalent to Qalb (Heart) in Sufism and its experiential qualities and functions are known as “sacred impulses” or “Positive Emotions”.

John G. Bennett (1897-1974), a contemporary student of both Ouspensky and Gurdjieff, researched the sources of Gurdjieff’s teaching and concluded that these Positive Emotions were in fact derived from the Laṭāʾif of Sufism.

Nevertheless, specific knowledge and realization of the Positive Emotions as Laṭā’if are rarely emphasized in schools of the Fourth Way teaching today.

=== The Diamond Approach ===
The Diamond Approach is a spiritual teaching developed by Hameed Ali (A. H. Almaas) (1944–) and Faisal Muqaddam (1946-) beginning in the 1970s. The history of the teaching was influenced both by Idries Shah and by Gurdjieff's Fourth Way.

It confirms the Naqshbandi (Punjab) understanding of five fundamental Laṭāʾif and then expands it to include dozens of similar human capacities for which the more general term “Essential Aspects” is adopted.

Unlike the Gurdjieff/Ouspensky Fourth Way, the Diamond Approach uses various mental, emotive, and somatic methods for realizing the Laṭāʾif, as a central part of its overall teaching and practice.

== The Laṭāʾif in animals ==
Most Sufi traditions are silent about whether or not the Laṭāʾif are also present in animals.

Nevertheless, Islamic theology considers animals to possess divine Ruḥ (Spirit). And Mulla Sadra, arguably the most significant Islamic philosopher after Avicenna, considers animals to also have an imaginal (Malakut) Soul, though they lack the additional intellect ('Aql) that defines the human Soul.

Accordingly, some Sufi orders (for example the Azeemia) do teach that certain of the Laṭāʾif function in animals.

In addition, the presence of Laṭāʾif in animals is consistent with those Sufi traditions (such as the Naqshbandi (Punjab)) that view the Laṭāʾif as implicit in certain psycho-physiological functions, many of which are common to both humans and animals.

== History of the Laṭāʾif ==
The spiritual experiences identified by Sufism as the Laṭāʾif have their immediate historical antecedents in the Emanationism of Neoplatonism (3rd century AD), which is known to have influenced the subsequent development of Sufism (see: Platonism in Islamic philosophy). The Emanations of Neoplatonism, in turn, arose from the Theory of forms of Plato (4th century BC).

The general concept of spiritual “subtle centers” originated within Persian Sufism: Junayd of Baghdad (835–910), al-Hallaj (858–922), and Shahab al-Din Abu Hafs Umar Suhrawardi (1145–1234).

Kubrawi Sufi Najm al-Din Razi (1177–1256) proposed five “inner means of perception” (Qalb, Ruh, Sirr, Khafi, and Ikhfa) that parallel the five physical senses. It's unclear to commentators whether these inner senses were already systematized as Laṭāʾif at that time.

The earliest systematic formulation of the Laṭāʾif is thought to be that of Kubrawi Ala ud-Daula Simnani (1261–1336), who proposed seven Laṭāʾif, relating them to the seven ontological levels of Sufi cosmology.

From the 17th to 19th centuries, the Indian Mujaddidis, beginning with Ahmad Sirhindi (1564–1624), returned to a standardized interpretation of five experiential Laṭāʾif and associated their locations with parts of the physical body.

The Punjab tradition within the Naqshbandi in the late 19th and 20th centuries continued with five Laṭā’if but identified the experience of their physical locations differently and viewed them as spiritual organs/capacities that also underlie ordinary forms of human consciousness.

It is thought by some that, just as with the nominal 99 Names of God in Islam and their underlying Divine Attributes, the number of Laṭāʾif and their potential realization by humanity might actually be unlimited.

== See also ==
- Al-Insān al-Kāmil
- 'Aql
- Arcs of Descent and Ascent
- Dhikr
- Emanationism
- Illuminationism
- Islamic cosmology
- Muraqabah
- Neoplatonism
- Platonism in Islamic Philosophy
- Qalb
- Ruh
- Subtle Body
- Sufi cosmology
- Sufi psychology
- Tajalli
- Tawajjuh
