= Baháʼí cosmology =

Baháʼí view on reality

The Baháʼí ringstone symbol, showing the worlds of God, the Manifestation of God and creation, all linked by the Holy Spirit

In Baháʼí cosmology reality is divided into three divisions. The first division is God, who is preexistent and on whom the rest of creation is contingent. The second division is God's Logos, the Primal Will, which is the realm of God's commands and grace. This realm pervades all created things. The Manifestations of God, Messengers from God, are appearances of the Logos in the physical world. The third division is Creation, which includes the physical world. Creation is not seen as confined to the material universe, and individual material objects, such as the Earth, are seen to come into being at a particular moment and subsequently to break down into their constituent parts. Thus, the current universe is seen as a result of a long-lasting process (cosmological time scales), evolving to its current state. In the Baháʼí Faith, the whole universe is a sign of God and is dependent on him and humanity was created to know God and to serve his purpose.

== Realms ==
Baháʼu'lláh, the founder of the Baháʼí Faith, distinguished five realms of existence. The terminology used can partly be traced back to Islamic Neoplatonism and Sufism, but this does not mean that Baháʼu'lláh supports a Neoplatonist or Sufi worldview. He views all metaphysical viewpoints as relative, reflecting only the soul or psyche and cultural background of the individual rather than any Absolute Truth. The Baháʼí teachings de-emphasize the importance of metaphysics, while focusing primarily on social and personal ethics.

God is manifested in all five realms, the Manifestations of God in all but the first realm, and humans exist between the angelic and physical realms and can choose which to live in.

| Realm | Descriptions | Stages of creation (arc of descent) | Colour symbolism |
|---|---|---|---|
| Háhút (Note: Moojan Momen states that the "last four realms appear to be addressing the first realm in the Long Obligatory Prayer (salát-i kabír): "I testify unto that whereunto have testified all created things (násút), and the Concourse on high (malakút), and the inmates of the all-highest Paradise (jabarút), and beyond them the Tongue of Grandeur itself from the all-glorious Horizon (láhút), that Thou art God... " Bahá'u'lláh, Prayers and Meditations, No. CLXXXIII, p. 246/321." (the terms in between brackets do not occur in the original text. The terms used are: ashyáʼ, al-maláʼ al-aʻlá, jannat al-ʻulyá, and al-ufuq al-abhá.)) | The essence of God unmanifested.; The 'Hidden Mystery' or the 'Hidden Treasure', the Absolute Unknown, the Primal Oneness. | | |
| Láhút | The All-Glorious Horizon, the Heavenly Court, the Throne of God.; The names and attributes of God are manifested.; The station of pure abstraction and essential unity.; The Holy Spirit, the Word of God (Logos), the First Intellect, the Divine Will.; The Universal Manifestation of God, Burning Bush, the speaker on Sinai, the Ancient Beauty, the Divine Lote Tree, the Alpha and the Omega, the First and the Last, the Most Exalted Pen, the Tongue of Grandeur, the Lord of Lords, the Primal Will, the First Intelligence.; The Divine Dove, the Angel Gabriel, the Maid of Heaven, the Mystical Nightingale. | Will (mashiyyat) | Snow-White |
| Jabarút | The all-highest Paradise.; The realm of Command or Decree.; The station of distinction: the Manifestations of God (including Adam, Noah, Abraham, Moses, Zoroaster, Jesus, Muhammad, the Báb and Baháʼu'lláh) acquire individual existences and become channels of the divine will.; The Mother Book (eternal spiritual laws), the Preserved Tablet (divine decrees, knowledge of past and future) and the divine Pen. | Purpose, Determination (iradah) | Yellow (golden) |
| Malakút | The All-glorious Paradise, Abhá Kingdom; The angelic realm, the world of souls.; Includes the Concourse on High (the souls of prophets, martyrs and saints). | Predestination/Destiny (qadar) | Green |
| Násút | The physical world, subdivided into the human, animal, vegetal and mineral kingdoms. | Fate, decree (qada); Implementation; Record | Crimson |

All the divine worlds revolve around this world, and all are interdependent. The divine worlds can only be described by metaphors, and can be compared with the world of dreams. The realms of Nasut and Malakut are parts of the 'world of creation' and are ruled by the same spiritual laws.

The purpose of life in this world is to develop spiritual qualities that are needed in the next world. Man has a free will to live a material life in the world of Nasut, or a life of detachment in the realm of Malakut, manifesting the names and attributes of God.

The Kingdom of Names pervades all realms from Láhút to Násút, as everything exists only by reflecting the divine Names.

Baháʼu'lláh explains that the 'realm of subtle entities' (ʻalam-i-dharr, a reference to God's primordial covenant with humanity mentioned in Qurʼán 7:172^{[Quran 7:172]}) refers to the revelation of the Prophets. Before the Word of God is revealed, all people are considered equal in rank. Differences only appear after the Prophet reveals himself, caused by the different responses of each individual's free will.

Baháʼu'lláh also wrote of many worlds of God. In the Súriy-i-Vafa, he writes: "Know thou of a truth that the worlds of God are countless in their number, and infinite in their range. None can reckon or comprehend them except God, the All-Knowing, the All-Wise." ʻAbdu'l-Bahá, son and successor of Baháʼu'lláh, wrote in the Lawh-i-Aflákiyyih (Tablet of the Universe) that there are infinite Manifestations of God in the infinite worlds of God.

Baháʼu'lláh explained that while humans should seek knowledge, no human can understand the nature of God's creation or God himself. He stated that while God had given humans a rational mind, humans are unable to comprehend the inner reality.

== See also ==
- Arcs of Descent and Ascent
- Baháʼí Faith and the unity of religion
- Baháʼí Faith on life after death
- Baháʼí Faith and science
- Some Answered Questions
- Cosmology in medieval Islam
- Kingship and kingdom of God
- Sufi cosmology
- Religious cosmology
- Rūḥ, Nafs, and 'Aql
