= Alam al Mulk =

Physical realm in Islamic cosmology

Alam al Mulk (the kingdom) is a term of islamic cosmology and refers to the realm, representing the physical plane, including medicine, engineering and everything, that can be perceived by the five senses. Higher Realms are not thought to be spatial, rather a higher realm means, it impinges the realms below. The physical plane is therefore influenced by Alam al Malakut (imaginal realm) and which is in turn influenced by Alam al Jabarut (the spiritual world).
