= Imaginal =

Imaginal may refer to:

- Imagination
- the Imago stage in insect development

== See also ==
- Imaginal exposure therapy
- the Imaginal Realm in Islamic cosmology
- works by philosopher Henry Corbin
- the imaginal discs or cells of insects
