= A Hidden Treasure =

Prominent Hadith in Islamic mysticism and philosophy

The Hadith of the Hidden Treasure (Arabic: کنزاً مخفیاً) is a hadith qudsi that has a very prominent role in Islamic mysticism and Islamic philosophy.

== Different translations ==
The most cited version of this Hadith in Arabic is: کنت کنزاً مخفیاً فأحببت أن أعرف فخلقت الخلق لکی أعرف

It has different translations in English:

- I was a hidden treasure; I loved to be known. Hence I created the world so that I would be known
- I was a hidden treasure, and I wished to be known, so I created a creation (mankind), then made Myself known to them, and they recognised Me
- I was a Treasure unknown then I desired to be known so I created a creation to which I made Myself known; then they knew Me

== Sufi cosmology ==
According to Sufi cosmology, God's reason for the creation of this universe and mankind is the "manifestation" and "recognition" of Himself as it is stated in this hadith.

== Ghulat usage ==
In extreme forms of Shi'a Islam (ghulat), this has been cited as to justify that Ali and Muhammad are the manifestations of Allah.

== In the Baháʼí faith ==
Bahá'u'lláh, founder of the Baháʼí faith, requested his son `Abdu'l-Bahá, who later became his successor, to write a commentary on the hadith of the Hidden Treasure for a Súfí leader named `Alí Shawkat Páshá. In this commentary 'Abdu'l-Bahá discusses the themes "Hidden Treasure", "Love", "Creation", and "Knowledge".

== See also ==
- Sufi metaphysics
- Sufi philosophy
