= Alam al Jabarut =

Highest realm in Islamic cosmology

Alam al-Jabarut (Arabic: عَالَم الْجَبَرُوت, romanized: ʿālam al-jabarūt "World of Power") is a realm proposed in Islamic cosmology. According to Suhrawardi (1154–1191), this is the highest realm and denotes the place of God's presence. Below alam al-jabarut lies alam al-malakut "World of Sovereignty", followed by alam al-mulk "World of Dominion". The term jabarut doesn't appear in the Quran, but al-jabbar does (59:23). Thus, the things in al-jabarut were those which cannot change and are compelled in their state of eternity.

In the writings of al-Ghazali (c. 1058–1111), alam al-jabarut has not been conceived as the highest realm yet but connects the physical realm (al-mulk) with the intelligible world (al-malakut). First centuries later, alam al-jabarut becomes an independent ontological realm, latest within the writings of Suhrawardi. Here, al-malakut is below alam al-jabarut, which in turn, is placed above alam al-mulk. The higher realms are thought to influence the realms below, but not as spatially separated worlds.

Aziz ad-Din Nasafi, a 13th-century Persian Sufi, describes in Manazil as-sa'irin the ontological ordering of the world. Accordingly, both alam al-malakut and alam al-mulk, in which existence is actual, are potentially in jabarut. The term "world" (alam) is accidental, thus limited to al-mulk and al-malakut, but not applied to jabarut, which is eternal.

While some scholars argued there is no significant difference between alam al-jabarut and al-malakut, others regarded alam al-jabarut to be the abode of the highest angels (Cherubim) and spirits. At the same time al-malakut denotes a realm for lower spirits (angels, jinn, Satan). In this regard, al-jabarut is also considered to be the created aspect of rasul and the original reality of Adam as the perfect human (Al-Insān al-Kāmil). The lower angels, who dwell in al-malakut, could be encountered by humans, the most elected angels inhabit al-jabarut. This would depict the domain of primary angelic manifestations; the realm of archetypes, thrones and powers. This is also the paradise of the afterlife excepting the supreme paradise. This realm is thus eternal existence while the others are created and limited.

== See also ==
- Beri'ah
- Sufi cosmology
