= Tawajjuh =

Sufi practice

Tawajjuh is a system practiced in sufism for the heart-to-heart transmission of spiritual energy from a Master to a student.

The Lataif-e-Sitta are the most common forms of this transmitted spiritual energy.

An example of such Latifa transmission by the teacher includes physical touch (except for women) and the disclosure to the student of the specific one of the Names of God in Islam that is associated with the Latifa. The student then continues the practice by silent dhikr of the Divine Name, focusing attention on the Latifa's location; sometimes a visualization of the Name, the corresponding prophet, or the teacher is also added.

== Etymology ==
Tawajjuh is the Sufi system wherein transmission of spiritual energy happens from heart-to-heart. The transmission happens to a student from a Master. It is believed to be imparted in four different ways: "(l) Islahi (corrective concentration), (2) Alqai (subtle or psychic), (3) Ittehadi (unifying) and (4) Qalabi (spiritual)."

== Related articles ==
- Lataif-e-Sitta
- Sufism in India
