= Some Answered Questions =

Baháʼí text containing ʻAbdu'l-Bahá's views on religion, philosophy and science

Some Answered Questions (abbreviated SAQ; Persian version: Mufáviḍát-i-‘Abdu'l-Bahá) is a compilation of table talks of ʻAbdu'l-Bahá that were collected by Laura Clifford Barney between 1904 and 1906 across several pilgrimages. The book was first published in English in 1908. ʻAbdu'l-Bahá was the son of Baháʼu'lláh, the founder of the Baháʼí Faith, and was appointed by him as his successor and interpreter of his words.

The book covers a variety of subjects, including religion, philosophy, science, human evolution, immortality of the soul, labor strikes, reincarnation, and a variety of Christian topics.

== History ==
ʻAbdu'l-Bahá's answers were first written down in Persian by a secretary, and afterwards revised twice by ʻAbdu'l-Bahá. In 1908, three first editions were published: The Persian text by E.J. Brill in The Netherlands; the English translation of Laura Clifford Barney by Regan Paul, Trench, Trübner & Co. in London; and a French edition translated by Hippolyte Dreyfus, published by Ernest Leroux in Paris.

A new English translation revised by a committee at the Baháʼí World Centre was published in 2014 and made available in early 2015.

== Overview ==
The book is divided into five parts:

=== I. On the Influence of the Prophets in the Evolution of Humanity ===
Part one covers topics such as the one universal law that governs nature, rational, and spiritual proofs of the existence of God, Manifestations of God (Abraham, Moses, Jesus, Muhammad and his wives and battles, the Báb, and Baháʼu'lláh), and Biblical prophecies from chapters 8, 9, and 12 of the Book of Daniel (see Day-year principle), chapter 11 of the Book of Isaiah and chapters 11 and 12 of the Book of Revelation.

=== II. Some Christian Subjects ===
Part two consists of subjects of Christian interest, such as the significance of symbolism ("intelligible realities and their expression through sensible forms"), an examination and breakdown of various verses from the Bible, the story of Adam and Eve, the birth of Jesus, the "greatness of Christ," baptism, miracles, the Eucharist, Peter and the Papacy, the resurrection of Jesus, the Holy Spirit, the second coming of Jesus, the Day of Judgement, the Trinity, sin, blasphemy, and predestination.

=== III. On the Powers and Conditions of the Manifestations of God ===
Part three speaks about topics such as the five aspects of spirit, the stations, power, and influence of the Manifestations of God, progressive revelation, the two classes of Prophets, God's rebukes of the Prophets, and infallibility.

=== IV. On the Origin, Powers and Conditions of Man ===
The fourth part includes a Bahai commentary on the theory of evolution, the origin of the universe, the difference between man and animal, the origin of man, the difference between the soul, mind, and spirit, human nature, the origin of the spirit and mind of man, the relationship between the spirit and the body, the relationship between God and man (emanationism), the physical and intellectual powers of man, the differences of character in men, the degree of knowledge man possesses and the knowledge the Manifestations of God possess, man's knowledge of God, the immortality of the spirit, the state and progress of the spirit after death, fate, the influence of the stars, free will, visions, dreams and communication with spirits, and spiritual and physical healing.

=== V. Miscellaneous Subjects ===
Part five goes into topics such as the nonexistence of evil, two kinds of torment, the justice and mercy of God, the punishment of criminals, strikes, reality, pre-existence, reincarnation, pantheism ('Unity of Existence'), four kinds of comprehension, and ethics.

== See also ==
- Baháʼí cosmology
- Baháʼí Faith and science
- Baháʼí Faith and the unity of religion
- Kitáb-i-Íqán
- Tablet to Dr. Forel
