= Sufi cosmology =

Sufi approach to cosmology

Sufi cosmology (Arabic: الكوزمولوجية الصوفية) is a Sufi approach to cosmology which discusses the creation of man and the universe, which according to mystics are the fundamental grounds upon which Islamic religious universe is based. According to Sufi cosmology, God's reason for the creation of this cosmos and humankind is the "manifestation" and "recognition" of Himself as it is stated in Hadith Qudsi – "I was a hidden Treasure; I desired to be recognized so I created the creature".

== Emanation ==
Islamic Sufis describe the Divine Descent and the creation of universe and humankind in the following stages, when Noor-e-Ahadi (Light of One), coming out of His self-isolated oneness, intended to manifest Himself in multiplicity. These stages are also termed as "Tanzalat-e-Satta". Many saints have explained these Tanzalat-e-Satta in their books. Abu Saeed Mubarak Makhzoomi has discussed them in his Arabic book called Tohfa Mursala. They are also discussed in the exegesis of Fusoos-ul-Hikam, a book by Ibn Arabi.

- Alam-i-HaHoot (Realm of He-ness): The level of HaHoot refers to HaHooiyat (The Unknowable and Incomparable world). It is an Arabic term which pertains to the Divine's Essence prior to manifestation. The spiritual stage related to it is called Ahdiyat (Alonehood). This is the Realm of pre-existence and a level of non creation. According to sufis, this state of Ahdiyat is incapable of being conceived, incapable of interpretation and is beyond all logical bounds. At this stage Allah is all alone and hidden in his own veil and cannot be exemplified with anything. Nothing exists here, neither the universe nor the creation. Here the Zaat (Divine essence) and neither His attributes are revealed or manifested.
- Alam-i-Yahoot (Realm of First Manifestation): The spiritual stage pertaining to YaHoot is referred to as Wahdat (Oneness). YaHoot is the first level of manifestation of "Hoo". When the Divine Essence desired to manifest, He manifested Himself in the form of Noor-e-Mohammad (Light of Muhammad). Since YaHoot is a world of Oneness, so it clarifies that Noor of Mohammad is a manifestation of God's Essence and is not a separate entity. This is the first step towards Divine descent. The creation has not started yet. Here Hoo is called Allah which in Arabic means "He", because there is a being in the form of Noor of Mohammad who worships Allah. And the level is called yaHoot because there is an entity who would address Hoo as YaHoo (O’Hoo).
- Alam-i-LaHoot (Realm of Absolute Unity): The world of LaHoot is related to the level of Wahdiyat (Unity). Here the soul of Mohammad is manifested from the Noor of Mohammad. Since this is a world of Unity so at this level Noor of Allah and Noor of Mohammad are in the same form. Therefore, the soul of Mohammad is in fact the soul of Allah called Rooh-e-Qudsi (The Divine Soul). At this level the whole universe and its creation is hidden in Noor-e-Mohammad and is anxious to manifest itself.

The above three levels are the levels of Unity and non-creation. The presence of Hoo in HaHoot, YaHoot and LaHoot indicates Absolute Unity. The creation takes place in the coming levels of Jabrut, Malakut and Nasut.

- Alam-i-Jabrut (Realm of Intelligence): Jabrut refers to the world of eternal lights, the Cherubinic intelligences. It is formless yet innumerably populated by the highest rank of angels and contains the divine attributes of Allah which were present in unity in the Lahut. It is comparable to Plato's realm of Ideas.
- Alam-e-Malakut (Realm of Soul): This level refers to the world of archetype images (not necessarily in the visual sense). At this level the intelligences, now called souls, took a recognizable but immaterial form for the first time. Here the "kingly souls" (Rooh-e-sultani) got concealed in a body of celestial light. It is also at this level where psychic qualities like lust, greed, anger, etc. exist. In short, the realm of images, operating through the organ of imagination, gives form and body to the archetypes that exist at the level of intelligences.
- Alam-i-Nasut (Realm of Physical bodies): The level of Nasut refers to the physical world of material bodies. The stage where foundations of the tangible world of matter are laid. Here Rooh-e-Noorani got concealed in the cover of Rooh-e-Heywani (the soul directly related to the physical body) which was the breathed into the physical bodies of flesh and bones and non-living things. The process of human creation got completed here and Allah manifested Himself completely in Humans by concealing in the covers of Rooh-e-Qudsi, Rooh-e-Sultani, Rooh-e-Noorani and Rooh-e-Heywani.

== See also ==
- Arcs of Descent and Ascent
- Cosmology in medieval Islam
- Meaning of life
- Suhrawardi
- Sufi metaphysics
- Sufi philosophy
