= A. H. Almaas =

American writer and spiritual teacher (born 1944)

- Born: Abdul Hameed Al Ali; 1944 (age 81–82); Kuwait
- Occupations: Spiritual teacher, writer
- Writing career
- Genres: Spirituality, psychology, metaphysics
- Notable works: The Pearl Beyond Price (1988); The Point of Existence (2000); Inner Journey Home (2004)

A. H. Almaas (/ˈɑːlməs/ AHL-məss) is the pen name of A. Hameed Ali (born 1944), an American writer and spiritual teacher who writes about and teaches an approach to spiritual development informed by modern psychology and therapy which he calls the Diamond Approach. "Almaas" is the Arabic word for "diamond". Almaas is originally from Kuwait. He is the spiritual head of the Ridhwan School.

Almaas' books were originally published by the Ridhwan School, under the Diamond Books publishing title, but are now published by Shambhala.

== Life ==
A. Hameed Al Ali was born in Kuwait in 1944. He contracted polio at 18 months old and walks with a crutch as a result. At the age of 18, he moved to the United States to study at the University of California, Berkeley. While Ali was working on his PhD in physics, he started attending workshops on spirituality at the Esalen Institute. By 1971, he had joined a psychospiritual group led by Claudio Naranjo. His work with Naranjo and others in the relationship between psychoanalysis and spirituality resulted in the creation and unfoldment of the Diamond Approach.

== Diamond Approach ==
=== Spiritual practice as a phenomenology of being ===
The Diamond Approach is described by Almaas as a

response to an important need that is being felt in many quarters, a need for a spiritually informed psychology, or conversely, for a psychologically grounded spirituality. This perspective does not separate psychological and spiritual experience, and hence sees no dichotomy between depth psychology and spiritual work... This body of knowledge is not an integration or synthesis of modern depth psychology and traditional spiritual understanding. The inclination to think in terms of integration of the two is due to the prevailing belief in the dichotomy between the fields of psychology and spirituality, a dichotomy in which the Diamond Mind understanding does not participate.

=== Principal ideas ===
==== Structure of reality ====
In the Diamond Approach, reality is seen as consisting of three elements: God/Being/Spirit, Soul/Self and World/Cosmos.

Being is understood as the inner source and true nature of reality, which is the focus of the great spiritual traditions of both East and West, and is known as Dharmakaya, Shunyata, Brahman or Tao. Being is understood as consisting of five co-emergent "boundless dimensions": Divine Love, Pure Presence, Nonconceptual Awareness, The Logos, and The Absolute.

Soul is understood to be the individual consciousness that connects the world with Being, an idea found in ancient Chinese philosophy. It is believed in the Diamond Approach that the soul can be experienced as a living presence that contains the thoughts, feelings and sensations usually called our "self".

World is understood as the outer manifestation of reality, the multitude of physical forms that all people are familiar with.

==== Essence and the essential aspects ====
While most spiritual paths conceive of Being as universal, the Diamond Approach also pays a great deal of attention to a more individual way of experiencing Being, called Essence. The concept of Essence is similar to the Hindu idea of Atman. While Being is the true nature of all of reality, Essence is the portion of it that forms the true and personal nature of the soul. It is experienced as a substantial fluid Presence which can differentiate into various qualities or aspects, such as compassion, strength, will, joy, peace, love, value, humanness, personalness, identity, and space.

==== Theory of holes ====
As our soul develops it is faced with a double challenge: it must learn to function in the World, while also remaining connected to Spirit. For various reasons, some innate and others environmental, we slowly become alienated from our Essence through the development of fixed patterns of perception and behaviour known as the personality or ego. Each of these patterns or ego structures disconnects us from a specific Essential Aspect. In other words, it is built around the "Hole" of this aspect. By exploring its structure, both cognitively and experientially, one eventually confronts the Hole and by going through it the lost aspect is retrieved.

=== Methodology ===
The Diamond Approach uses methods which its founders learned from Claudio Naranjo. Naranjo was a student of Oscar Ichazo and he took a part of Ichazo's teachings back to the west where Almaas was then introduced. Almaas' scientific background helps explain the emphasis on rigorous (self) inquiry.

==== Presence ====
The practice referred to as "presence" is based on two methods, learning to sense one's body (especially one's arms and legs) in an ongoing manner and regularly focusing one's attention on a point in the belly called the "kath center" (known in Chinese philosophy as the dantian and in Japanese culture as the hara). These methods help a person to become more grounded in the body and in physical reality and also, in time, to develop the ability to experience oneself as the presence of Essence.

==== Inquiry ====
The Diamond Approach centers on practice of investigation of the self, experience and perception. "Inquiry" answers the question posed by Socrates: "How does one set up as the object of one's investigation, that about which one knows nothing?" (Plato, Apology of Socrates 23b, 29b). One starts by wanting to find out, living a question, while recognizing preconceptions, preconditions and expectations as to the nature of what one may learn and instead attending to one's immediate or present experience. While not explicitly acknowledged as such, inquiry in effect combines (as a descriptive mechanism only, as the inquiry process is beyond mere language) the practice of Edmund Husserl's "transcendental phenomenological reduction, or epoché", with Sigmund Freud's psychodynamic exploration. An important feature of inquiry is that a person learns to be aware of both the content of experience (emotions, thoughts, sensations) and the attitudes and reactions towards it. In this way the subject-object dichotomy is transcended and one learns to relate to oneself without having to create inner splits. Open-ended inquiry is both a path to, and the state of, a realized person and in time is understood to be a self-revelation of the mysteries of Being.

== Critiques ==
The fees associated with the retreats and other methodologies that are part of the structure of the school have been criticized. However, the founder and lead teacher, Hameed Al Ali, regularly (in Berkeley, California, and in Boulder, Colorado) points out that the Diamond Approach is only one path to truth and cannot in itself be all-encompassing. Students are permitted and even encouraged to question the practices of the school and to explore whether the school is a good fit for them personally.

The work of Almaas has received praise from spiritual teachers and explorers such as John Welwood, Gabor Maté, Jack Kornfield and Ken Wilber. Wilber, while tentatively supportive of the Diamond Approach, disputes some details. For example, he does not agree that infants have essential experiences, maintaining that the infant exists purely in the physical, material world – "instinctual, vital, impulsive, narcissistic, egocentric; living for food, its God is all mouth". Almaas has responded that Wilber's critique demonstrates a misinterpretation based on Wilber's own linear, four-stage categorization of spiritual development. Almaas' perspective is that infants experience a type of true nature/Spirit, but one that is very distinct from, and less integrated than, the experiences of essentially realized adults.

== Ridhwan School ==
The Ridhwan School is a loosely-knit affiliation of ongoing spiritual groups founded in 1976 by Almaas. The school is dedicated to the teaching of the Diamond Approach. It is principally based in Berkeley, California and Boulder, Colorado with other groups throughout North America and in parts of Europe and Australia. Almaas is the spiritual head of the school and individual groups are taught by qualified Ridhwan teachers. The name of the school derives from the Arabic word for "contentment":

Ridhwan is a kind of contentment which arises when you're liberated. Your personality becomes contented when you're free. Your personality itself is free from its suffering and conflict.

The school rejects "quick fixes" and graduation, and the students are engaged in learning and inner work for an indefinite period. While some might characterize "inner work" (or spiritual work) as therapy, Almaas makes several important distinctions between therapy and spiritual work.

== Publications ==
- The Elixir of Enlightenment. Red Wheel Weiser. 1984. ISBN 978-0-87728-613-4.
- Essence: The Diamond Approach to Inner Realization. Red Wheel Weiser. 1986. ISBN 0-87728-627-2.
- Essence with The Elixir of Enlightenment: The Diamond Approach to Inner Realization. Weiser Books. 1998. ISBN 1-57863-044-4.
- Facets of Unity: The Enneagram of Holy Ideas. Shambhala Publications. 2000. ISBN 978-0-936713-14-4.
- Luminous Night's Journey: An Autobiographical Fragment. Shambhala Publications. 2000. ISBN 978-0-936713-08-3.
- The Inner Journey Home: Soul's Realization of the Unity of Reality. Shambhala Publications. 2004. ISBN 978-1-59030-109-8.
- The Power of Divine Eros. Shambhala Publications. 2013. ISBN 978-1-61180-083-8. Co-authored with Karen Johnson.
- Runaway Realization. Shambhala Publications. 2014. ISBN 978-1611802023.
- The Alchemy of Freedom. Shambhala Publications. 2017. ISBN 978-1611804461.
- Keys to the Enneagram: How to Unlock the Highest Potential of Every Personality Type. Shambhala Publications. 2021. ISBN 978-1611809435. Foreword by Russ Hudson.

Journey of Spiritual Love Series

- Love Unveiled: Discovering the Essence of the Awakened Heart. Shambhala Publications. 2020. ISBN 978-1611808391. Foreword by Ram Dass.

Diamond Mind Series

- The Void: Inner Spaciousness and Ego Structure (2nd ed.). Shambhala Publications. 2000. ISBN 978-0-936713-06-9.
- The Pearl Beyond Price. Shambhala Publications. 2000. ISBN 978-0-936713-02-1.
- The Point of Existence. Shambhala Publications. 2000. ISBN 978-0-936713-09-0.

Diamond Heart Series

- Diamond Heart Book One: Elements of the Real in Man. Shambhala Publications. 2000. ISBN 978-0-936713-01-4.
- Diamond Heart Book Two: The Freedom to Be. Shambhala Publications. 2000. ISBN 978-0-936713-04-5.
- Diamond Heart Book Three: Being and the Meaning of Life. Shambhala Publications. 2000. ISBN 978-0-936713-05-2.
- Diamond Heart Book Four: Indestructible Innocence. Shambhala Publications. 2000. ISBN 978-0-936713-11-3.
- Diamond Heart Book Five: Inexhaustible Mystery. Shambhala Publications. 2011. ISBN 978-1-59030-906-3.

Diamond Body Series

- Spacecruiser Inquiry: True Guidance for the Inner Journey. Shambhala Publications. 2002. ISBN 978-1-57062-859-7.
- Brilliancy: The Essence of Intelligence. Shambhala Publications. 2006. ISBN 978-1-59030-335-1.
- The Unfolding Now: Realizing Your True Nature through the Practice of Presence. Shambhala Publications. 2008. ISBN 978-1-59030-559-1.

== See also ==
- Enneagram of Personality
