= Arcs of Descent and Ascent =

Ontological circle in Neoplatonism, Islam and Sufism

The Arcs of Descent and Ascent (Arabic: قوس النزول وقوس الصعود), an ontological circle, are described in Neoplatonism, as well as in Islamic and Sufi cosmology, mainly inspired by the works of Ibn al-Arabi. In the Arc of Descent ("qaws al-nuzuli"), from unity to diversity, God creates successively the Intellect (Supreme Pen), the Universal Soul (Guarded Tablet), Prime Matter, Nature, the Universal Body (including the imaginal world) and the Earth. The Arc of Ascent ("qaws al-su'ud") is the way back to the Presence of God, the process of spiritual perfection.

In a hadith attributed to Ja'far al-Sadiq, the sixth Imam of Shi'i Islam, the arc of descent is described as having seven stages. These stages have been commented on in Shaykhism.

== In Bábism and the Baháʼí Faith ==
In the Bábí and Baháʼí Faiths the seven stages of the Arc of Ascent are described as follows: Will (Mashiyyat), Determination (Iradih), Destiny (Qadar), Decree (Qada), Permission (Idhn), Term (Ajal), and Book (Kitab). In Some Answered Questions 'Abdu'l-Bahá states that "man is in the ultimate degree of materiality and the beginning of spirituality; that is, he is at the end of imperfection and the beginning of perfection. He is at the furthermost degree of darkness and the beginning of the light. That is why the station of man is said to be the end of night and the beginning of day."

The Báb explained that the obligatory prayer symbolizes a spiritual journey from the realm of the body to the realm of the heart, which can be described as an arc of ascent, mirroring the arc of descent from God to creation. The Seven Valleys of Bahá'u'lláh is another example of the arc of ascent. It describes the valley of search, the valley of love, the valley of knowledge, the valley of unity, the valley of contentment, the valley of wonderment, and the valley of true poverty and absolute nothingness. 'Abdu'l-Bahá describes the following: The depraved soul, the self-accusing soul, the inspired soul, the assured soul, the contented soul, the accepted soul, the perfect soul, the soul of the Kingdom of God (malakút), the soul of the Dominion (jabarút) and the Divine Soul (lahút).

== See also ==
- Purgatory
- Araf (Islam)
- Matarta
