= Al-Birjandi =

16th-century Persian polymath

al-Birjandi
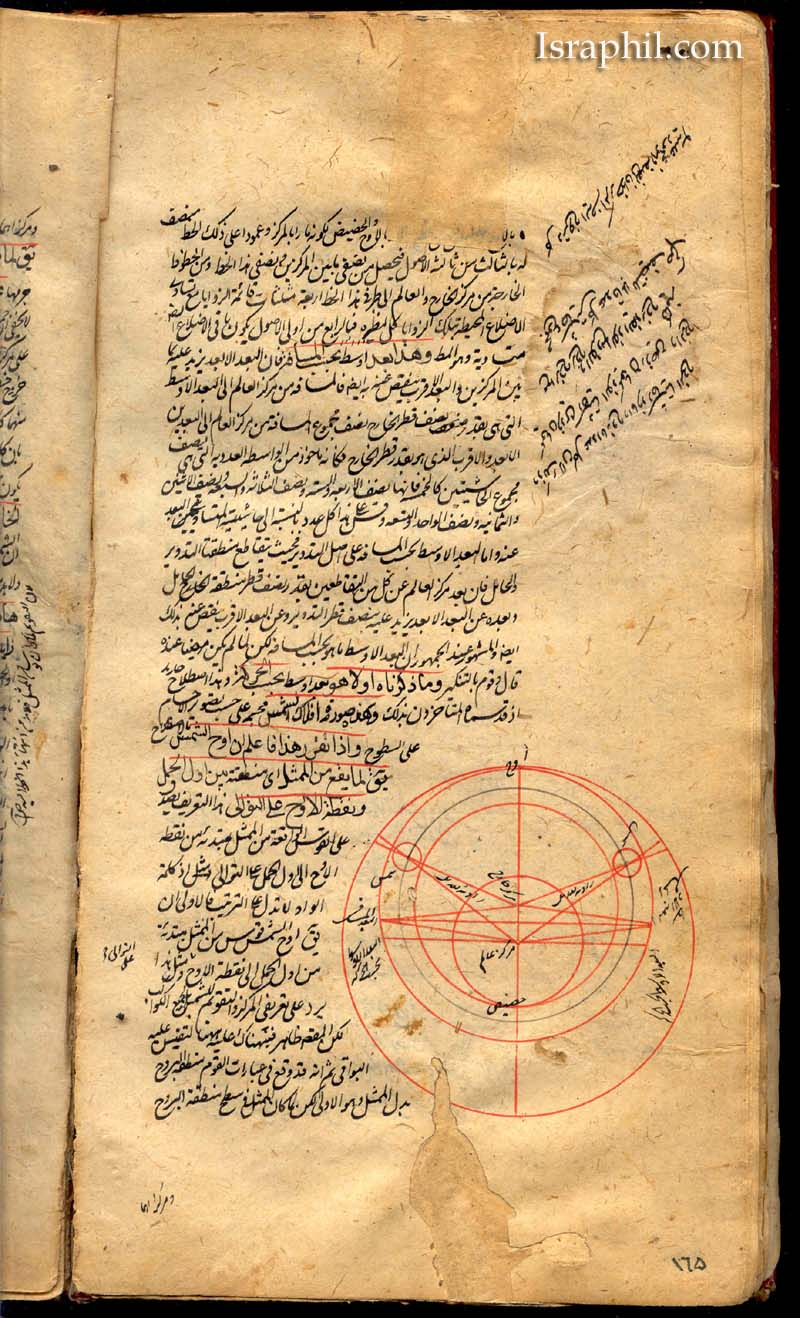
- A work of al-Birjandi's, Sharh al-Tadhkirah, a manuscript copy, beginning of the 17th century
- Died: 1525–1526

Academic background
- Influences: Naṣīr al‐Dīn al‐Ṭūsī, al-Kashi

Academic work
- Era: Islamic Golden Age

Abdal Ali ibn Muhammad ibn Husayn Birjandi (Persian: عبدالعلی محمد بن حسین بیرجندی) (died 1528) was a 16th-century Persian astronomer, mathematician and physicist who lived in Birjand.

== Astronomy ==
Al-Birjandi was a pupil for Mansur ibn Muin al-Din al-Kashi, a member at the Samarkand Observatory, otherwise known as The Ulugh Beg Observatory. In discussing the structure of the cosmos, al-Birjandi continued Ali al-Qushji's debate on the Earth's rotation. In his analysis of what might occur if the Earth were moving, he develops a hypothesis similar to Galileo Galilei's notion of "circular inertia", which he described in the following observational test (as a response to one of Qutb al-Din al-Shirazi's arguments):

The small or large rock will fall to the Earth along the path of a line that is perpendicular to the plane (sath) of the horizon; this is witnessed by experience (tajriba). And this perpendicular is away from the tangent point of the Earth's sphere and the plane of the perceived (hissi) horizon. This point moves with the motion of the Earth and thus there will be no difference in place of fall of the two rocks.

== Works ==
Al-Birjandi wrote some more than 13 books and treatises, including:

- Sharh al-tadhkirah, a commentary on Tadhkira, al-Tusi 's memoir. This work provides explanations for the reader, and provides alternative views while assessing the viewpoints of predecessors, which is consistent with the Islamicate commentary tradition. The text, in some copies of the manuscript from 17th century, is written throughout in black and red ink with diagrams illustrating many of the astronomical elements discussed. The 11th chapter of the book was translated to Sanskrit in 1729 at Jaipur by Nayanasukhopadhyaya. The 11th chapter specifically talks about the Tusi Couple, mainly when applying those concepts to lunar theory. Birjandi objects the applications of celestial spheres resting between two points of motion. When talking about curvilinear or spherical concepts of the Tusi Couple, it makes a slight longitudinal inclination. A Persian, Muhammad Abida dictated it to Nayanasukha, allowing him to compose it in Sanskrit. Kusuba and Pingree present an edition of the Sanskrit, and in a separate section, an English translation facing the Arabic original. That chapter has attracted attention among European scholars since the late 19th century. Al-Birjandi on Tadhkira II, Chapter 11, and Its Sanskrit Translation by Kusuba K. and Pingree D. ISBN 978-90-04-12475-2 was published in 2001 by Brill Academic Publishers.
- Sharh-i Bist Bab dar Ma'rifat-i A'mal-i al-Asturlab (Commentary on "Twenty Chapters Dealing with the Uses of the Astrolabe" of Nasir al-Din al-Tusi; Persian.
- Risalah fi Alat al-Rasad (Epistle on observational instruments); in Arabic.
- Tadhkirat al-Ahbab fi Bayan al-Tahabub (Memoir of friends: concerning the explanation of friendship [of numbers]); in Arabic.

Birjandi contributed to many different fields besides his commentaries. His works included studies of ephemerides, instruments for astronomical observations, and cosmology. He also worked in determining the size and distance of planets that have been associated to Habib Allah.

He also had works in the field of theology and made a series of almanacs in 1478/1479.
