= Baháʼí views on science =

The Bahá'í Faith teaches that there is a harmony or unity between science and religion, and that true science and true religion can never conflict. This principle is rooted in various statements in the Bahá'í scriptures. Some scholars have argued that ideas in the philosophy of science resonate with the Bahá'í approach. In addition, scholars have noted the Bahá'í view of interpreting religious scriptures symbolically rather than literally as conducive to harmony with scientific findings. The Bahá'í community and leadership have also applied their teachings on science and religion with the goal of the betterment of society, for instance by providing education and technology.

== The principle of the harmony of science and religion ==
The principle of the harmony of science (or reason) and religion (or faith) has been a verbalized principle of the religion since ʻAbdu'l-Bahá's journeys to the West from 1910 to 1913 as an extension of the view of the singularness of reality to be explored through independent investigations by reasoned and spiritual methods. It had been discussed without the specific wording a decade earlier via a compilation Anton Haddad put together with Mírzá Abu'l-Faḍl along with their own perspective - a subject that was subsequently taken up by American Bahá'ís. Saiedi characterizes the relationship between science and the Bahá'í Faith, and the Bahá'í Faith and the importance of reason, as "one of its main spiritual principles."

The Bahá'í view of science has been summarized as emphasizing recognition of the process of science, although not one isolated to the "scientific method" from a set of values and societal choices and understandings, not mere faith in the conclusions which are always open to refinement, without casting so much doubt that the process of science is somehow lacking because it is influenced by current understandings and conditions to which religion can have a strong influence.

'Abdu'l-Bahá told jokes at the expense of materialist scientists. However, according to Phelps, he reserved his harshest condemnations for religious people who took religious scripture literally, who he said "…have become the cause of much of the conflict in the world, whether between different faith communities or between science and religion…"

=== In the Bahá'í writings ===
While writing on the Bahá'í views on science, certain excerpts from Bahá'í scriptures are commonly used by experts; the following are a few examples. (Note: There have been many compilations published. A recent official collection is published at Scholarship (online ed.). Bahá’í International Community. 2022.)

Nader Saiedi, adjunct professor at UCLA, notes Bahá'u'lláh criticized a pursuit of pseudoscience which claimed that "…numerous esoteric sciences is required to understand the mysteries of the sacred Word."

Phelps quotes Bahá'u'lláh on the issue of language and understanding:

[S]ince all do not possess the same degree of spiritual understanding, certain statements will inevitably be made, and there shall arise, as a consequence, as many differing opinions as there are human minds and as many divergent beliefs as there are created things. This is certain and settled, and can in no wise be averted…. Our aim is that thou shouldst urge all the believers to show forth kindness and mercy and to overlook certain shortcomings among them, that differences may be dispelled; true harmony be established; and the censure and reproach, the hatred and dissension, seen among the peoples of former times may not arise anew.

'Abdu'l-Bahá anonymously published The Secret of Divine Civilization in 1875 in Iran, noting how the country had declined among the nations "as a result of poor education, bad governance, ignorance of scientific advances, rejection of innovation, and the atrophy of the life of the mind." and later restated Bahá'u'lláh's teaching, saying:

Religious teaching which is at variance with science and reason is human invention and imagination unworthy of acceptance, for the antithesis and opposite of knowledge is superstition born of the ignorance of man. If we say religion is opposed to science, we lack knowledge of either true science or true religion, for both are founded upon the premises and conclusions of reason, and both must bear its test.” (The Promulgation of Universal Peace)

Religion and science are the two wings upon which man’s intelligence can soar into the heights, with which the human soul can progress. It is not possible to fly with one wing alone! Should a man try to fly with the wing of religion alone he would quickly fall into the quagmire of superstition, whilst on the other hand, with the wing of science alone he would also make no progress, but fall into the despairing slough of materialism. (Paris Talks)

Scientific knowledge is the highest attainment upon the human plane, for science is the discoverer of realities. It is of two kinds: material and spiritual. Material science is the investigation of natural phenomena; divine science is the discovery and realization of spiritual verities. The world of humanity must acquire both. (The Promulgation of Universal Peace)

Shoghi Effendi, head of the religion 1921–1957, offered a vision of the future including this principle:

In such a world society, science and religion, the two most potent forces in human life, will be reconciled, will co-operate, and will harmoniously develop…. The economic resources of the world will be organized, its sources of raw materials will be tapped and fully utilized, its markets will be co-ordinated and developed, and the distribution of its products will be equitably regulated. (World Order of Bahá'u'lláh)

The Bahá'í International Community released a statement in 1995, The Prosperity of Humankind which says in part:

For the vast majority of the world’s population, the idea that human nature has a spiritual dimension—indeed that its fundamental identity is spiritual—is a truth requiring no demonstration. It is a perception of reality that can be discovered in the earliest records of civilization and that has been cultivated for several millennia by every one of the great religious traditions of humanity’s past. Its enduring achievements in law, the fine arts, and the civilizing of human intercourse are what give substance and meaning to history. In one form or another its promptings are a daily influence in the lives of most people on earth and, as events around the world today dramatically show, the longings it awakens are both inextinguishable and incalculably potent.

and further:

Future generations … will find almost incomprehensible the circumstance that, in an age paying tribute to an egalitarian philosophy and related democratic principles, development planning should view the masses of humanity as essentially recipients of benefits from aid and training. Despite acknowledgment of participation as a principle, the scope of the decision making left to most of the world’s population is at best secondary, limited to a range of choices formulated by agencies inaccessible to them and determined by goals that are often irreconcilable with their perceptions of reality.

The scholar Graham Hassall summarizes that statement saying it "demonstrates the breath-taking scope of the Bahá'í program of governance reform, from local to global levels, and encompasses not only political and legal fundamentals, but the roles of science and technology in the global distribution of knowledge and power." and university professor Sabet Behrooz called "…a brilliant statement … (showing) the necessity of harmony between science and religion …(which) must be the guiding light and the organizing principle of our endeavors in integrative studies of the Bahá'í Faith."

== Implications ==
A number of scholars have offered commentary on the Bahá'í teachings on science and religion. Saiedi outlines several implications of the Bahá'í view of an agreement between religion and science or reason:

- religious evolution of understanding laws and institutions.
- religion is not a substitute or competition with science but have a mutual reciprocity because of their individual qualities
- rather than take religious statements literally, the Bahá'í Faith provides a lexicon of interpretations or allegorical relationships of past statements
- an acceptance of the laws of nature as an expression of divine will and so called miracles are not evidence otherwise.

Phelps lists the following three points:

- that ultimate reality is ineffable
- that humility about what can be understood and applied is itself "the highest degree of human attainment"
- that religious scripture is metaphorical, not literal.

Farzam Arbab, project developer and Bahá'í administrator, also states that religious literalism is a problem.

Ian Kluge, independent scholar, observed a relationship between the Bahá'í stance of science and reason and the Bahá'í teaching on independent investigation for the individual where without reason and faith together, quoting `Abdu'l-Bahá, "...the heart finds no rest in it, and real faith is impossible..." and beyond the individual to societal progress which would be "...trapped in traditional worldviews or paradigms, be they religious, cultural, intellectual, or scientific..." and appealed to Aristotle’s four-fold causality which to him "...suggests that science deals with material and efficient causality whereas religion deals with issues related to formal and final causality."

Scholars have also drawn parallels between Bahá'í views of science and the views of various philosophers. Karlberg and Smith underscore and summarize the work of Alan Chalmers and Peter Godfrey-Smith who had published university press texts, in relation to the Bahá'í Faith on a number of points. Arbab appealed to Thomas Nagel's thoughts on "sophisticated secularism." Roland Faber elaborated this approach in parallel with the philosophy of Alfred North Whitehead (so-called Process philosophy) and William S. Hatcher drew on the ideas of Aristotle, Avicenna, Bertrand Russell, and Stephen Hawking in his defence of the Bahá'í view.

Sociologist Margit Warburg quotes a 1978 letter from the Universal House of Justice "The principle of the harmony of science and religion means not only that religious teachings should be studied with the light of reason and evidence as well as of faith and inspiration, but also that everything in this creation, all aspects of human life and knowledge, should be studied in light of revelation as well as in that of purely rational investigation." From it Warburg sees a "clear stance in the dilemma between academic freedom and acceptance of religious premises" and the issues of where "possible conflict with doctrines that can be tested empirically" can occur. She notes that at the inauguration of the chair for Bahá'í Studies at Hebrew University of Jerusalem, Peter Khan spoke saying in part that the place of Bahá'í understanding between science and religion was not in the "narrow definitions of legitimate scholarly activity in some disciplines within the academic community" criticizing the materialistic scientific studies of religion, asking that Bahá'í scholars, in Warburg's words, "should not comply with their academic tradition" which ignore the spiritual inputs of religion which will conflict with the Bahá'í Faith's own teachings. Warburg criticizes Khan's statement as a spokesman of the Bahá'í Faith in this situation and what it could mean for Bahá'í administration. "That is precisely what is at stake in the case of the controversial sources to Babi and Baha’i history, as well as concerning the sources to the construction of Abraham."

Behrooz Sabet proposed a review of the progressive nature of religion and scholarly activity with history and present contexts in 2000. He stated that "An integrative approach to understanding the implications of the Bahá'í teachings, however, follows developmental processes that begin as primarily internal and evolve in a direction of externalization and fusion with other branches of knowledge. Historically, religions show a similarity of patterns in the development of learning and scholarship methods. For instance, in earlier configurations of integrative studies, a conflict between internal and external is unavoidable since the internal values of the emerging religion are based on a prescriptive (or declarative) style of thinking that presupposes the existence of an inherent circle of unity among its teachings, while the dominant mode of scholarship in the scientific and academic community may view the validity of those presuppositions untenable. Generally speaking, absolutist positions and authoritarian attitudes expressed by the gatekeepers of knowledge in both science and religion have obscured people's clarity of vision and hindered the union of these two essential entities of human life. In the Bahá'í view, universal teachings of religion should be interpreted within the context of the relativity of human comprehension and the historical nature of knowledge."

== Applications ==
Others have addressed the work of a relationship between science and religion in practical expressions of development. Matthew Weinberg and Arbab, Boicu and Zabihi-Maghaddam, reviewed cases of a social engagement in locally meaningful progress that included a cooperative engagement between religion and science in particular processes.

The influence of the Bahá'í teaching on science and religion was visible in the practice of the religion dating back to the 1870s in the face of a perception of a lot of superstition of Iranian society and taking a stance towards education, science, and technology. Scholars Filip Boicu and Siyamak Zabihi-Maghaddam underscored the Bahá'í view on education directly related to this teaching of the religion which led to some early Bahá'í schools in Iran. Boicu and Zabihi-Maghaddam, recalling the Bahá'í experience in Iran on early schooling which had been extended about education of girls, followed developments of three models of education - Anisa, FUNDAEC, and the Core Curriculum - all of which had direct applications of the teaching and only being distinguished on the application between the individual alone, the individual in a society, and the last one being of all people in the whole of society and a global community.

In the early 20th century, as the Bahá'í Faith was expanding in the United States, the Bahá'í community viewed the issue of race according to another Bahá'í principle – the oneness of humanity – which had been expressed earlier but was further substantiated by 1912 during `Abdu'l-Bahá's talks to American audiences. The idea of interracial unity was counter to views of the majority of scientists of the coming decades and for a time in government policies, which endorsed eugenics as legal steps against Indigenous Americans, people of African descent, and generally People of Color, and other practices according to white-society standards, and similarly in other countries such as when the religion was banned in Germany under the Nazis. However, the American Bahá'í community did not respond by denigrating the scholarly thought of the day, but rather by supporting the then-minority view of scholars who opposed scientific racism. Marion Carpenter, a notable early American Bahá'í youth, is quoted in 1925 saying “Not religion or science, but religion and science, the combination of faith and reason, is the teaching of Bahá’u’lláh to the world today.” The American scientist Herbert Miller defended interracial unity at a Bahá'í-sponsored World Unity Conference in 1926 in Cleveland.

Project analyst Matthew Weinberg outlined socioeconomic development cases using the non-profit ISGP - the Institute for Studies for Global Prosperity, "a non-profit organization working in collaboration with the Baha’i International Community", in India, Uganda, and Brazil. In India stakeholders in a project developed an engagement of religion and science anchored in community of practice was seen as a majority point of view of the participants in the conference and the Indian National Spiritual Assembly established an office - the "Secretariat for the Promotion of the Discourse on Science, Religion, and Development" in 2001. They had successive meetings in 2004 and 2007 and ongoing. In Uganda work reached a point in 2001 working with IGSP that Ugandan president Yoweri Museveni encouraged the work of nurturing social unity "by championing the equality of women and men, alleviating poverty, and overcoming entrenched patterns of corruption." Again materialistic approaches were seen as failing alone. In Brazil again in 2001 a program of action was initiated, seminars were held and a group formed to develop analysis of the system published a book and simultaneously application in some local community "Centers of Learning" and one as a pilot project, but to advance the group needed to approach the work with some values: "To set out on a new path requires courage—not an arrogant disposition that demands swift and radical action, but one that is tempered with humility and wisdom. It requires an environment where the dynamics of individual and collective transformation are fully considered; where it is realized that growth and change are organic, that they are gradual and slow, and that they involve constant action, evaluation, and study; and where it is understood that, in pursuing such transformation, one is faced with an ongoing tension between absorbing setbacks and gaining new ground."

== Influence ==
Sociologist Michael McMullen found that Bahá'í converts in the United States appreciated the teaching of a harmony between science and religion as resolving their sense of these. They had been disillusioned with traditional organized religion but found that the Bahá'í Faith's use of science to inform religion "makes sense and provides meaning in a globalized world", and appreciated that the Bahá'í Faith had an evolutionary perspective on revelation via the teaching of progressive revelation. Post-doctoral scholar in Ottoman Studies and faculty at the Wilmette Institute, Necati Alkan documented the case of Muslim intellectual Abdullah Cevdet (1869–1932) in looking at the influence of the Bahá'í Faith and the teaching of the harmony of science and religion specifically as a model of reform but which was not accepted by the Turkish Muslim community.

== Baháʼí views on evolution ==
ʻAbdu'l-Bahá discussed evolution, including making claims that appear to contradict the modern doctrine of common descent for all earthly life. For example, in Some Answered Questions he said:

...from the beginning of man's existence on this planet until he assumed his present shape, form, and condition, a long time must have elapsed, and he must have traversed many stages before reaching his present condition. But from the beginning of his existence man has been a distinct species.

His teachings were widely interpreted as a kind of parallel evolution, in which humans had a separate line of descent to some primitive form, separate from animals. But the emphasis on the harmony of science and religion and the success of the modern evolutionary paradigm resulted in at least 19 books and articles from 16 authors over the period of 1990 to 2009 trying to address how Bahá'ís should view evolution in light of ʻAbdu'l-Bahá's statements, the majority of which took universal common ancestry as fact and attempted to reconcile with a new interpretation of the statements. Two articles by Keven Brown and Eberhard von Kitzing, jointly published under the title Evolution and Bahá'í Belief (2001), stand out as the only book-length review of the issue by Bahá'ís during the period, and has been well received.

The new understanding viewed the apparent meaning of parallel evolution as an unfortunate misunderstanding that should be carefully studied and interpreted in terms that make sense today. Gary Matthews wrote,

...the apparent contradiction is nothing more than a question of semantics: perhaps ʻAbdu'l-Bahá is merely dating man's beginning as a distinct species from the soul's first appearance, to emphasize that we do not derive our higher spiritual nature from our animal forebears."

This understanding was included in the Foreword to the 2014 printing of Some Answered Questions, stating:

...[ʻAbdu'l-Bahá's] concern is not with the mechanisms of evolution but with the philosophical, social, and spiritual implications of the new theory. His use of the term "species", for example, evokes the concept of eternal or permanent archetypes, which is not how the term is defined in contemporary biology. For Bahá'ís, the science of evolution is accepted..."

Not all Bahá'ís were convinced of the argument that ʻAbdu'l-Bahá's statements are in complete alignment with modern evolutionary theory. Salman Oskooi wrote his 2009 thesis on the subject and was unconvinced by the various authors trying to reconcile the issue with modern science, writing that ʻAbdu'l-Bahá's statements have an "apparent discord with science", "appear uninterpretable in any sense but their apparent meaning", and the apparent meaning is that "humans have been distinct from other beings since the time of some primitive stage of our evolution." Oskooi concluded that ʻAbdu'l-Bahá was fallible on scientific matters, but that the issue does not contradict the fundamental premise of the faith. Also in 2009, Ian Kluge wrote that, "There is no question that ʻAbdu'l-Bahá's views on human evolution are in conflict with current scientific thought", but he concluded that religion cannot "uncritically agree with science on all its pronouncements at all times" due to the changing nature of science itself.

In 2023, Bryan Donaldson published On the Originality of Species, attempting to address the issue from the point of view of new research in evolutionary biology that could plausibly support the idea of "independent and parallel growth of many categories of plants and animals out of a network of gene-sharing unicellular roots." Donaldson points to a variety of trends in evolutionary thought since the late 1990s, concluding that,

...it is no longer necessary to conclude that the concept of independent or 'parallel' descent is incompatible with science. In fact, the trend of discovery has clearly been in the direction of agreement... This new understanding appears to me to have only been possible since about 2015.

== See also ==
- Dialectic
