= Hadith Qudsi =

Compendium of sayings attributed to the Islamic prophet Muhammad

Hadith Qudsi الحديث القدسي
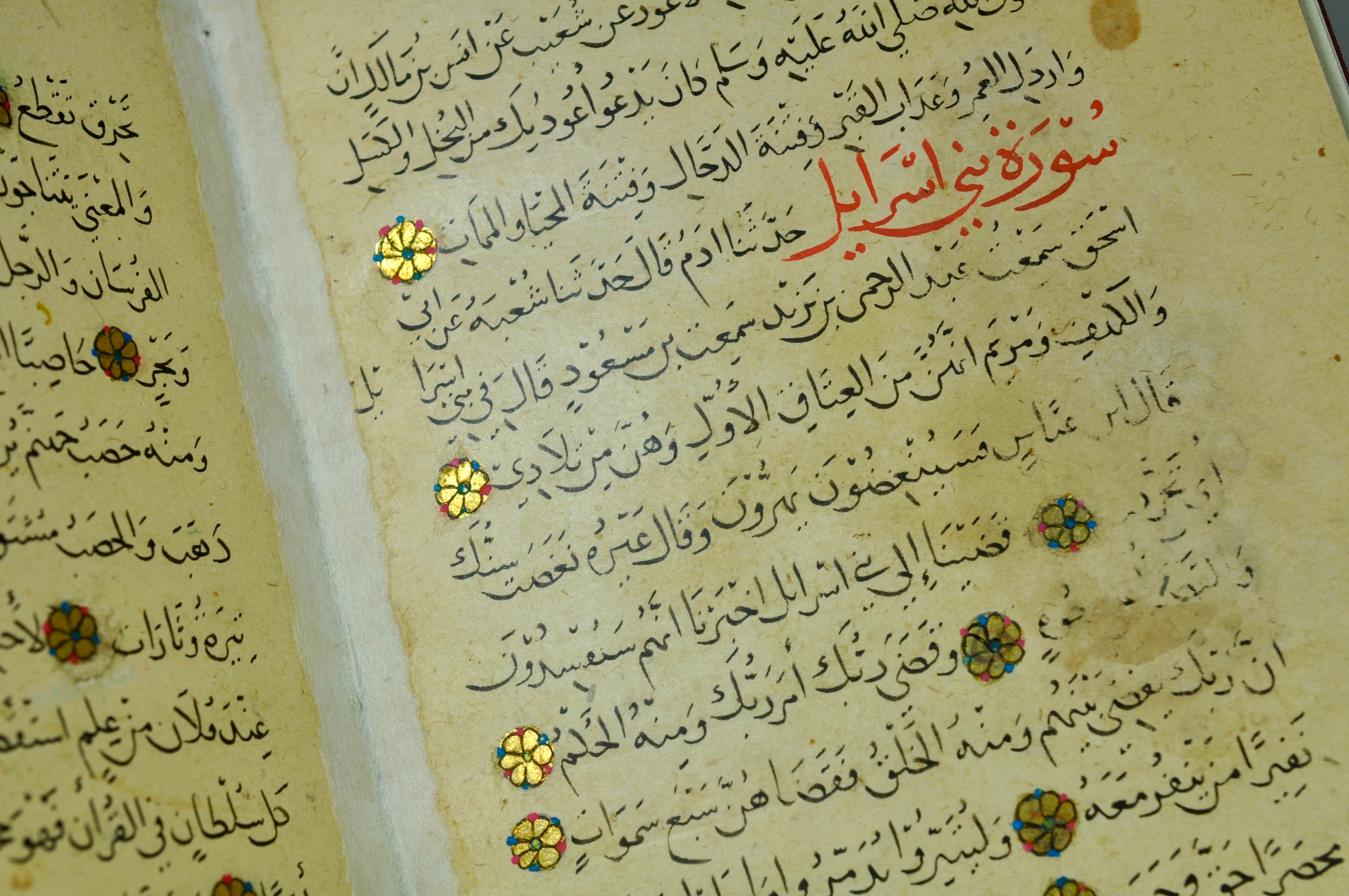
- Cultural origins: Narratives of God
- Formats: Text

Hadīth Qudsī (Arabic: الحديث القدسي, lit. 'sacred tradition/report') is a special category of Hadith, the compendium of sayings attributed to Allah through the Islamic prophet Muhammad. Since it is stated that these Hadiths are unique due to their attribution to God, they are given a special category, thus occupying a status between Qur'an and normal Hadith text.

== Examples ==
Such text can be found in primary as well as secondary sources of Hadith literature.

Abu Hurayrah, who said that the Messenger of Allah ﷺ said:

"When Allah decreed the Creation He pledged Himself by writing in His book which is laid down with Him: My mercy prevails over my wrath."

Abu Hurayrah reported that Allah's Messenger ﷺ said:

Allah, Mighty and Exalted is He, said: "If My servant likes to meet me, I like to meet him, and if he dislikes to meet Me, I dislike to meet him."

Umar ibn Khattab, narrated that the Messenger of Allah ﷺ said:

"Perhaps Allah has looked at those who witnessed Badr and said, 'Do whatever you like, for I have forgiven you.'" (Note: Consensus of scholars of Islam, included Ibn Taymiyyah has issued fatwa based on Hadith Qudse from Hatib ibn Abi Balta'ah has been elevated to the saints status by Allah Himself. as according to one Hadith, Muhammad told Gabriel that the Muslim humans and the angels attending in Badr were the best and most precious in the view of Allah. As it was attended by Mikail, Israfil, and thousands of best angels from third level of sky, all came to the battle of Badr by impersonating appearance of Zubayr ibn al-Awwam, companion of Muhammad.)

== Publications ==
Numerous publications have focused solely on Qudsi Hadiths, quoting between 40 and 1000 of such, from primary Hadith texts. These include:

1. An-Nawawis Forty Hadith Qudsi ISBN 8171015883
2. Al-Ithāfāt al-Saniyya bi’l-Aḥādīth al-Qudsiyya – A collection by Al-Munawi, arranged alphabetically, containing a total of 272 narrations.
3. 110 Hadith Qudsi ISBN 9960740846
4. 1000 Qudsi Hadiths: An Encyclopedia of Divine Sayings by Arabic Virtual Translation Center; Barnes & Noble Press (2017), ISBN 9781538018958.
