= Malakut =

Invisible realm in Islamic cosmology

The realm of Malakut (Arabic: عَالَم الْمَلَكُوت, romanized: ʿālam al-malakūt, lit. 'world of the kingdom [of God]'), also known as Hurqalya or Huralya, is a proposed invisible realm of medieval Islamic cosmology.

The Quran speaks of the malakūt al-samāwāt wa l-arḍ "kingdom of heaven and earth", where the heavenly kingdom represents the ultimate authority of God over the earth.

This concept is attested by the writings of al-Ghazali (c. 1058–1111), but limited to epistemological categories of understanding metaphysical realities (spirits, heavens, etc.). Only centuries later, in particular with the Illuministic school of thought (Ishrāqi) and ibn Arabi (1165 – 1240), was it developed into a full ontological concept.

Malakut is sometimes used interchangeably with 'ālam al-mithāl or imaginal realm, but otherwise distinguished from it as a realm between 'ālam al-mithāl and 'ālam al-jabarūt. In this context, Malakut is a plane below the high angels, but higher than the plane where the jinn and demons live. The higher realms are not spatially separated worlds but impinge the realms below.

== Al-Ghazali ==
In his The Incoherence of the Philosophers, Ghazali rejects denial of bodily resurrection, as proposed by some Muslim philosophers (like ibn Sina). Still, it seems al-Ghazali holds similar views regarding the time period from death until bodily resurrection. He seems to agree that pleasure and punishment during the time in the grave is not on equal with bodily experience. Instead, the grave life unfolds in a dream-like state. However, the deceased will enjoy or suffer as if it were experienced by someone with a body. In The Revival of the Religious Sciences Ghazali explains that in the world after death (malakut), like a dreamer truly sees the things in his dream, the deceased will see the images deriving from his soul after death and thus suffer just as much as a human awake.

Al-Ghazali draws a sharp distinction between the alam al-mulk ("World of Dominion") and the malakut ("World of Sovereignty"). The first is a sensual world of here and now, while the latter an intelligible everlasting world over which God presides, jinn (angels and devils) dwell, and revelation originates. The sensual world appears to be for al-Ghazali mere delusion, and a shadow of the real (haqq) world, which is malakut. This is comparable to the Quranic divide into dunya (world) and akhira (afterlife).

== Suhrawardi and the Imaginal Realm ==
Shahab al-Din Yahya ibn Habash Suhrawardi (1154–1191) draws upon a similar divide of the world into a sensual and an intelligible one, however adds a third layer, ʿālam al-jabarūt ("world of the power [of God]") in which God resides. In the intermediate sphere of malakut reside the angels and postmortem souls of humans. Although generally a deficit source of knowledge, imagination allows people to access some insights into the other world. According to Suhrawardi, after death, souls are attached to celestial bodies, which allows them to activate their imagination and experience of pain and pleasure. Contrary to ibn Sina's view, afterlife doesn't depend entirely on intellectual efforts, but also on imaginative faculties. While perfected souls join themselves with pure light of malakut, common people enter alam al-muthal ("World of suspended images). From the souls of the unfortunate, jinn and demons (div) derive. These lower souls dwell in a world without existence in a conventional sense, but comparable to a mirror.

Suhrawardi's "realm of suspended images" was developed by Al-Shahrazuri into the concept of alam al-mithal ("world of images") becoming a third realm between the sensible and the intelligible world. The world of images would be filled with layers of paradise, hell, and the people therein. Mulla Sadra, a Shia philosopher and theologian from the 16th century, conjectured that, like ibn Sina and al-Suhrawardi before him, souls in the otherworld create their own paradise and hell, depending on their imaginative faculties.

Some Shi'i authors refer to alam al-mithal as a continent named Hurqalya. Hurqalya is supposed to lie beyond Mount Qaf, the border of the known world, and is identical with the barzakh in Shaykh Ahmad's cosmological system.

The Imaginal Realm is considered to be a realm where all ideas, thoughts and actions are manifested, including supernatural experiences. Henry Corbin argued that alam al-mithal does not consist of images constructed by the mind, but the imaginative faculties unveil a hidden reality within the imaginal realm.

During sleep, the soul (nafs), is supposed to visit the imaginal realm in dreams.

== See also ==
- Jabulqa and Jabulsa
- Malkuth
- Sufi cosmology
- Yetzirah
