= Cosmology in the Muslim world =

Cosmology in the Muslim world is the cosmology of Islamic societies. Islamic cosmology is not a single unitary system, but is inclusive of a number of cosmological systems, including Quranic cosmology, the cosmology of the Hadith collections, as well as those of Islamic astronomy and astrology. Broadly, cosmological conceptions themselves can be divided into thought concerning the physical structure of the cosmos (cosmography) and the origins of the cosmos (cosmogony).

In Islamic cosmology, the fundamental duality is between Creator (God) and creation.

== Quranic cosmology ==
=== Overview ===
In Quranic cosmography, the cosmos is primarily constituted of seven heavens and earth. Above them is the Throne of God, a solid structure. Some interpretations state the Quran indicates a flat earth, calling the earth "stretched" or "spread out" (Qur'an 2:22; 13:3; 15:19; 50:7; 51:48; 79:30; 88:20; 91:6) and comparing its structure to a "bed" (Qur'an 20:53; 43:10) or a "carpet" (71:19), though these verses may highlight a metaphorical concept or referring explicitly to the 'land'(al-ard) from our perspective. The Quran also explicitly refers to wrapping "night over the day" and vice versa (Qur'an 39:5) with connotations of a continuous, spherical cycle, like the wrapping of a turban, derived from "يُكَوِّرُ" [/ju.kaw.wi.ru/ , yukawwiru, "He wraps"].Possibly referring to a globe-shaped Earth.This view was adopted by scholars such as Ibn Taymiyyah and Ibn Qayyim and several other contemporary scholars such as Ibn Baz.Though some classical literalist viewpoints of "flat Earth" remain

=== Heavens and the earths ===
The most important and frequently referred to constitutive features of the Quranic cosmos are the heavens and the earth:

The most substantial elements of the qurʾānic universe/cosmos are the (seven) heavens and the earth. The juxtaposition of the heavens (al-samāʾ; pl. al-samāwāt) and the earth (al-arḍ; not in the plural form in the Qurʾān) is seen in 222 qurʾānic verses. The heavens and the earth are the most vital elements on the scene—in terms of occurrence and emphasis—compared to which all other elements lose importance, and around which all others revolve. The same motif is used in the Bible as well.

References to heavens and earth constitute a literary device known as a merism, where two opposites or contrasting terms are used to refer to the totality of something. In Arabic texts, the merism of "the heavens and the earth" is used to refer to the totality of creation.

Contemporary and traditional interpretations have generally held in line with general biblical cosmology, with a flat Earth with skies stacked on top of each other, with some believing them to be domes and others flat circles. The Quranic cosmos also includes seven heavens and potentially seven earths as well, although the latter is disputed. Beginning in the second Islamic century, medieval scholars such as Ibn Taymiyya and Ibn Kathir believed the Earth was round.and that alongside it the heavens were like a dome and round covering the Earth and each heaven covering the heaven before it in a round-like shape.

=== Six day creation ===
The Quran states that the universe was created in six days using a consistent, quasi-creedal formula (Q 7:54, 10:3, 11:7, 25:59, 32:4, 50:38, 57:4). Quran 41:9–12 represents one of the most developed creation accounts in the Quran:

Say: "Do you indeed disbelieve in the One who created the earth in two days [bi-lladhī khalaqa l-'arḍa fī yawmayni], and do you set up rivals to Him? That is the Lord of the worlds. He placed on it firm mountains (towering) above it, and blessed it, and decreed for it its (various) foods in four days, equal to the ones who ask. Then, He mounted (upward) to the sky [thumma stawā 'ilā l-samā'i], while it was (still) smoke [wa-hiya dukhānun], and said to it and to the earth, 'Come, both of you, willingly or unwillingly!' They both said, 'We come willingly'." He finished them (as) seven heavens in two days [qaḍā-hunna sabʿa samāwātin fī yawmayni], and inspired each heaven (with) its affair.

This passage contains a number of peculiarities compared with the Genesis creation account, including the formation of the earth before heaven and the idea that heaven existed in a formless state of smoke before being formed by God into its current form.

== Cosmography ==
=== Theories of the entire cosmos ===
One theory of the entire cosmos was articulated by Fakhr al-Din al-Razi (1149–1209). In this conception, the entire cosmos can be divided into five spheres: five are part of the celestial sphere of the sun (Mars, Jupiter, Saturn, the fixed stars, and the "Great Sphere" (al-falak al-aʿẓam)), five within the sphere of the sun (Venus, Mercury, the moon, the "sublime sphere" (al-kurrat al-laṭīfah) of fire and earth, and the "gross sphere" (al-kurrat al-kathīfah) of water and earth), and finally the sun itself, which is also the center of the cosmos. For al-Razi, it is also true that the sun, moon, and the stars are themselves distinct from each of the spheres that they move in.

=== Seven heavens ===
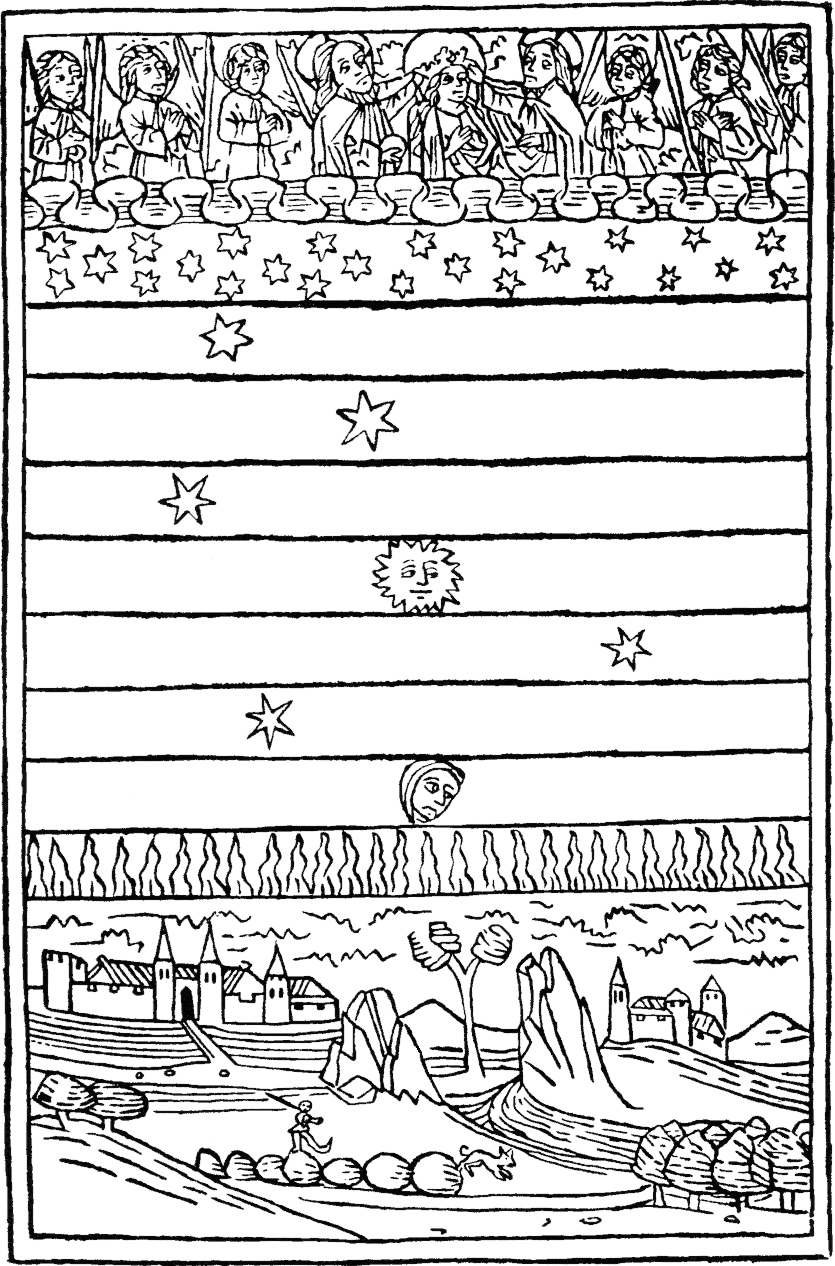
Wood carving 1475; pointing to 7 celestial bodies consisted 5 planets that can be seen with naked eye, the sun and the moon, each floating in a heaven layer, (Arabic Felaq in ancient cosmology)

The basic structure of the Islamic cosmos was one constituted of seven stacked layers of both heaven and earth. Humans live on the uppermost layer of the earth, whereas the bottommost layer is hell and the residence of the devil. The bottommost layer of heaven, directly above the earth, is the sky, whereas the uppermost one is Paradise. The physical distance between any two of these layers is equivalent to the distance that could be traversed with 500 years of travel. Other traditions describes the seven heavens as each having a notable prophet in residence that Muhammad visits during Miʿrāj: Moses (Musa) on the sixth heaven, Abraham (Ibrahim) on the seventh heaven, etc.

=== Shape of the earth ===
Some scholars, among them the hadith traditionalists, advocated the notion of a flat Earth and rejected notions of a round Earth once they had been introduced by the discovery of Hellenistic astronomy, especially the astronomical paradigm developed by Ptolemy and elaborated most extensively in his Almagest. Debate over the shape of the earth raged on in the medieval Islamic world, including among Kalam theologians.

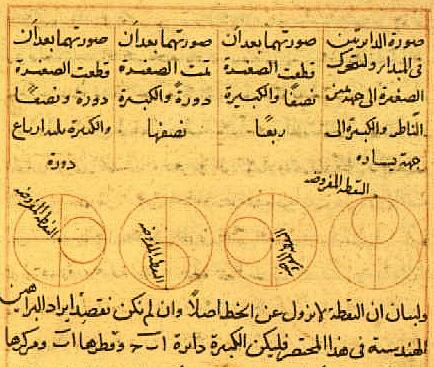
The Tusi-couple is a mathematical device invented by Nasir al-Din al-Tusi in which a small circle rotates inside a larger circle twice the diameter of the smaller circle. Rotations of the circles cause a point on the circumference of the smaller circle to oscillate back and forth in linear motion along a diameter of the larger circle.

=== Multiverse ===
Al-Ghazali, in The Incoherence of the Philosophers, defends the Ash'ari doctrine of a created universe that is temporally finite, against the Aristotelian doctrine of an eternal universe. In doing so, he proposed the modal theory of possible worlds, arguing that their actual world is the best of all possible worlds from among all the alternate timelines and world histories that God could have possibly created.

Al-Razi in his Matalib al-'Aliya explores the possibility that a multiverse exists in his interpretation of the Qur'anic verse "All praise belongs to God, Lord of the Worlds." Al-Razi decides that God is capable of creating as many universes as he wishes, and that prior arguments for assuming the existence of a single universe are weak:

It is established by evidence that there exists beyond the world a void without a terminal limit (khala' la nihayata laha), and it is established as well by evidence that God Most High has power over all contingent beings (al-mumkinat). Therefore He the Most High has the power (qadir) to create a thousand thousand worlds (alfa alfi 'awalim) beyond this world such that each one of those worlds be bigger and more massive than this world as well as having the like of what this world has of the throne (al-arsh), the chair (al-kursiyy), the heavens (al-samawat) and the Earth (al-ard), and the Sun (al-shams) and the Moon (al-qamar). The arguments of the philosophers (dala'il al-falasifah) for establishing that the world is one are weak, flimsy arguments founded upon feeble premises.

Al-Razi therefore rejected the Aristotelian and Avicennian notions of the impossibility of multiple universes and he spent a few pages rebutting the main Aristotelian arguments in this respect. This followed from his affirmation of atomism, as advocated by the Ash'ari school of Islamic theology, which entails the existence of vacant space in which the atoms move, combine and separate. He discussed in greater detail the void, the empty space between stars and constellations in the Universe, in volume 5 of the Matalib. He argued that there exists an infinite outer space beyond the known world, and that God has the power to fill the vacuum with an infinite number of universes.

=== Cosmographical writings ===
ʿAjā'ib al-makhlūqāt wa gharā'ib al-mawjūdāt (Arabic: عجائب المخلوقات و غرائب الموجودات, meaning Marvels of creatures and Strange things existing) is an important work of cosmography by Zakariya ibn Muhammad ibn Mahmud Abu Yahya al-Qazwini who was born in Qazwin year 600 (AH (1203 AD).

== Cosmogony ==
=== Rejection of an eternal universe ===
In contrast to ancient Greek philosophers who believed that the universe had an infinite past with no beginning, medieval philosophers and theologians developed the concept of the universe having a finite past with a beginning. The Christian philosopher John Philoponus, presented the first such argument against the ancient Greek notion of an infinite past. His views were adopted and elaborated in many forms by medieval Jewish and Islamic thinkers, including Saadia Gaon among the former and figures like Al-Kindi and Al-Ghazali among the latter. The two arguments used against an actual infinite past include arguments against the possible existence of an actual infinite and arguments against the possibility of arriving to an infinite sum by successive addition. The second argument was especially popularized in the work of Immanuel Kant. Today, these lines of reasoning form an important component of what is called the Kalam cosmological argument for the existence of God.

=== Six day creation ===
The Ismaili thinker Nasir Khusraw (d. after 1070) believed that the six-day creation period concerned not the creation of the physical cosmos but instead the spiritual one. Each of six days, from the first day of the week (Sunday) until Friday were symbolized by an individual figure, from Adam (Sunday), Noah (Tuesday), Abraham (Wednesday), Moses (Thursday), and Muhammad (who completes the six days on Friday). The seventh and final day was for the allocation of rewards and retribution.

=== Age of the universe ===
Early Muslim scholars believed that the world was six to seven thousand years old, and that only a few hundred years were remaining until the end/apocalypse. One tradition attributes to Muhammad a statement directed to his companions: "Your appointed time compared with that of those who were before you is as from the afternoon prayer (Asr prayer) to the setting of the sun". Early Muslim Ibn Ishaq estimated the prophet Noah lived 1200 years after Adam was expelled from paradise, the prophet Abraham 2342 years after Adam, Moses 2907 years, Jesus 4832 years and Muhammad 5432 years.

== Astrology ==
With the sole exception of Fakhr al-Din al-Razi in the 13th century, all notable philosophers that commented on astrology criticized it. However, astrology was often confused and/or conflated with astronomy (and mathematics). For this reason, and to evade the criticisms being made of astrologers, the astronomers themselves (including al-Farabi, Ibn al-Haytham, Avicenna, Biruni and Averroes) would try to carve out a separate identity from them by joining the fray in the attacks against astrology. Their reasons for refuting astrology were often due to both scientific (the methods used by astrologers being conjectural rather than empirical) and religious (conflicts with orthodox Islamic scholars) reasons.

Ibn Qayyim Al-Jawziyya (1292–1350) spent over two hundred pages of his Miftah Dar al-SaCadah refuting the practices of divination, especially in the form of astrology and alchemy. He recognized that the stars are much larger than the planets, and thus argued:

"And if you astrologers answer that it is precisely because of this distance and smallness that their influences are negligible, then why is it that you claim a great influence for the smallest heavenly body, Mercury? Why is it that you have given an influence to al-Ra's and al-Dhanab, which are two imaginary points [ascending and descending nodes]?"

Al-Jawziyya also recognized the Milky Way galaxy to be a myriad of individual stars among the fixed stars and therefore that the situation was too complex to infer the influences of such stars.

== Astronomy ==
=== Reception of Hellenistic astronomy ===
Much of 9th century astronomy in the Islamic world revolved around the dissemination of the astronomical work of Ptolemy, primarily through his Almagest. Translations of it were produced, and summaries and commentaries of it were also written. In 850, al-Farghani wrote his own summary of the work, titled Kitab fi Jawani Ilm al-Nujum ("A compendium of the science of stars"), a summary of Ptolemic cosmography. The primary purpose of the work was to help explicate Ptolemy's, but it also included some corrections based on the findings of earlier Arab astronomers. Al-Farghani gave revised values for the obliquity of the ecliptic, the precessional movement of the apogees of the Sun and the Moon, and the circumference of the Earth. The books were widely circulated through the Muslim world, and even translated into Latin. Under the caliph Al-Ma'mun, an astronomical program was instituted in Baghdad and Damascus with the stated intention of verifying Ptolemy's observations by comparing the predictions made from his models with new observations. The findings were compiled into a book called al-Zij al-Mumtahan ("The verified tables"), which is widely quoted in later astronomers but itself no longer extant.

=== Galaxy observation ===
The Arab astronomer Ibn Haytham (965–1040) "determined that because the Milky Way had no parallax, it was very remote from the earth and did not belong to the atmosphere." The Persian astronomer Abū Rayhān al-Bīrūnī (973–1048) proposed the Milky Way galaxy to be "a collection of countless fragments of the nature of nebulous stars." The Andalusian astronomer Ibn Bajjah ("Avempace", d. 1138) proposed that the Milky Way was made up of many stars which almost touched one another and appeared to be a continuous image due to the effect of refraction from sublunary material, citing his observation of the conjunction of Jupiter and Mars on 500 AH (1106/1107 AD) as evidence. Ibn Qayyim Al-Jawziyya (1292–1350) proposed the Milky Way galaxy to be "a myriad of tiny stars packed together in the sphere of the fixed stars".

In the 10th century, the Persian astronomer Abd al-Rahman al-Sufi (known in the West as Azophi) made the earliest recorded observation of the Andromeda Galaxy, describing it as a "small cloud". Al-Sufi also identified the Large Magellanic Cloud, which is visible from Yemen, though not from Isfahan; it was not seen by Europeans until Magellan's voyage in the 16th century. These were the first galaxies other than the Milky Way to be observed from Earth. Al-Sufi published his findings in his Book of Fixed Stars in 964.

=== Early heliocentric models ===
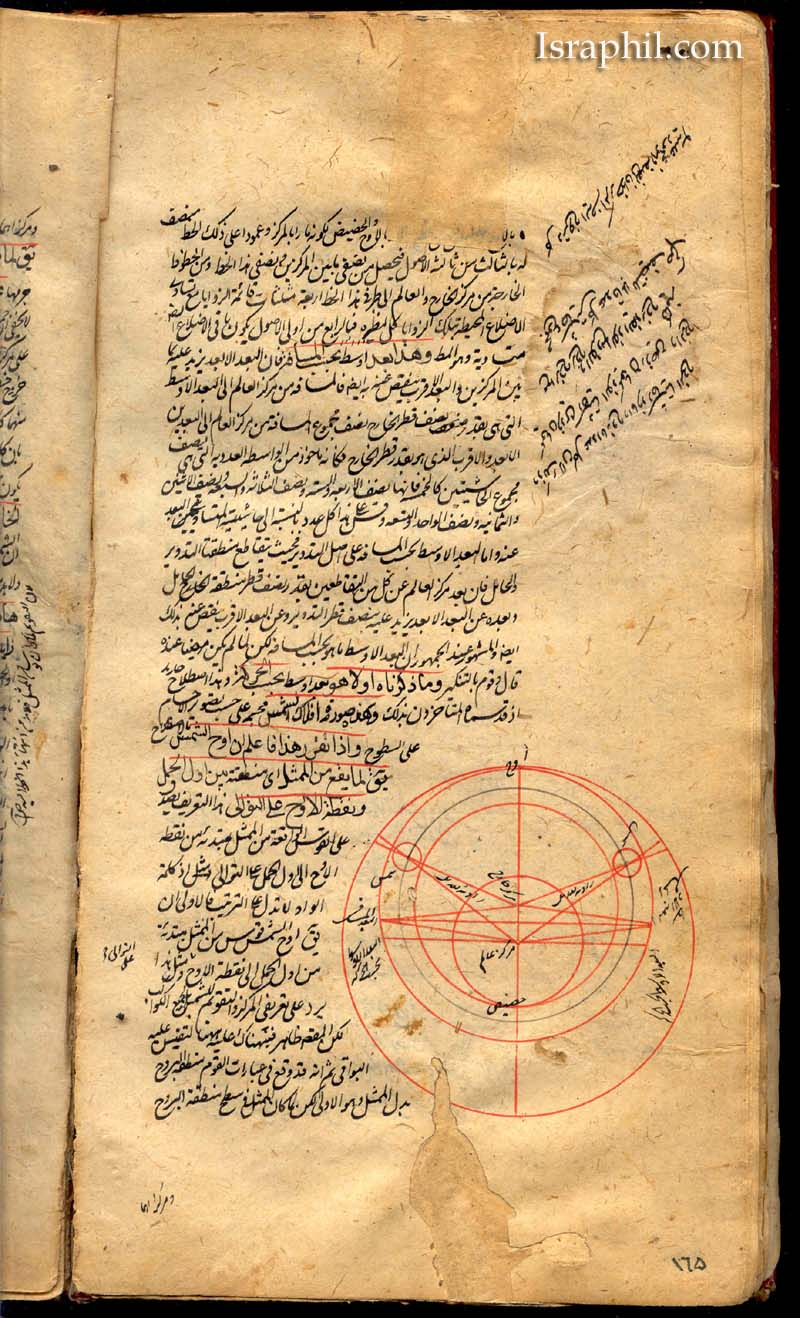
A work of Al-Birjandi's, Sharh al-Tadhkirah, a manuscript copy, beginning of 17th Century

The Hellenistic Greek astronomer Seleucus of Seleucia, who advocated a heliocentric model in the 2nd century BC, wrote a work that was later translated into Arabic. A fragment of his work has survived only in Arabic translation, which was later referred to by the Persian philosopher Muhammad ibn Zakariya al-Razi (865–925).

In the late ninth century, Ja'far ibn Muhammad Abu Ma'shar al-Balkhi (Albumasar) developed a planetary model which some have interpreted as a heliocentric model. This is due to his orbital revolutions of the planets being given as heliocentric revolutions rather than geocentric revolutions, and the only known planetary theory in which this occurs is in the heliocentric theory. His work on planetary theory has not survived, but his astronomical data was later recorded by al-Hashimi, Abū Rayhān al-Bīrūnī and al-Sijzi.

In the early eleventh century, al-Biruni had met several Indian scholars who believed in a rotating Earth. In his Indica, he discusses the theories on the Earth's rotation supported by Brahmagupta and other Indian astronomers, while in his Canon Masudicus, al-Biruni writes that Aryabhata's followers assigned the first movement from east to west to the Earth and a second movement from west to east to the fixed stars. Al-Biruni also wrote that al-Sijzi also believed the Earth was moving and invented an astrolabe called the "Zuraqi" based on this idea:

"I have seen the astrolabe called Zuraqi invented by Abu Sa'id Sijzi. I liked it very much and praised him a great deal, as it is based on the idea entertained by some to the effect that the motion we see is due to the Earth's movement and not to that of the sky. By my life, it is a problem difficult of solution and refutation. [...] For it is the same whether you take it that the Earth is in motion or the sky. For, in both cases, it does not affect the Astronomical Science. It is just for the physicist to see if it is possible to refute it."

In his Indica, al-Biruni briefly refers to his work on the refutation of heliocentrism, the Key of Astronomy, which is now lost:

"The most prominent of both modern and ancient astronomers have deeply studied the question of the moving earth, and tried to refute it. We, too, have composed a book on the subject called Miftah 'ilm al-hai'ah (Key of Astronomy), in which we think we have surpassed our predecessors, if not in the words, at all events in the matter."

=== Early Hay'a program ===
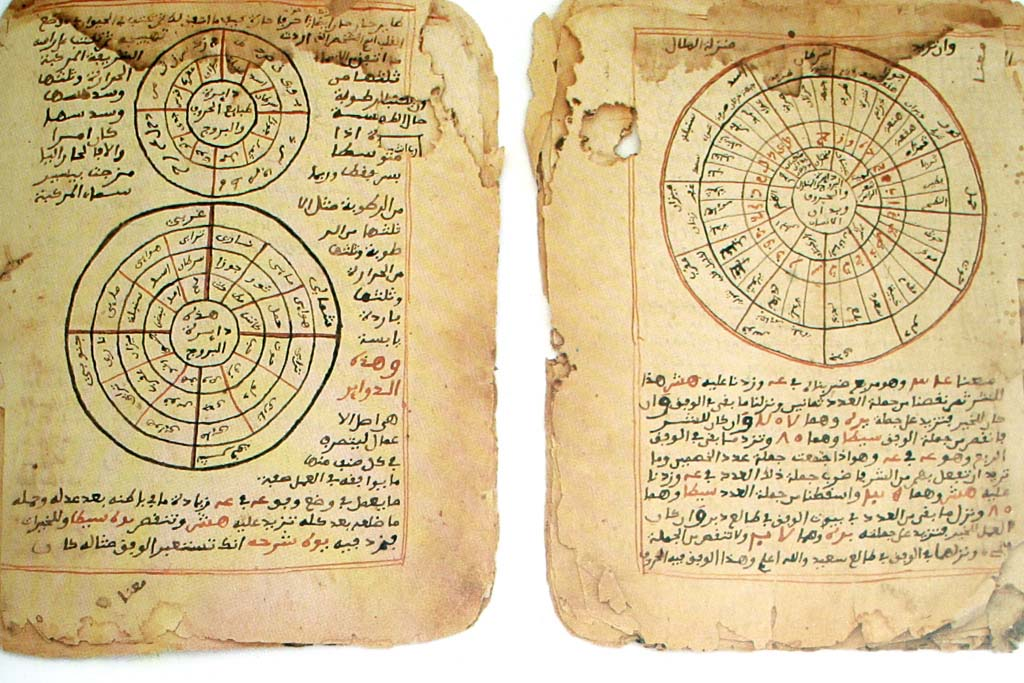
The Timbuktu Manuscripts showing both mathematics and astronomy.

Ibn al-Haytham (Latinized as Alhazen) wrote a work in the hay'a tradition of Islamic astronomy known as Al-Shukūk ‛alà Baṭlamiyūs (Doubts on Ptolemy). He criticized Ptolemy's astronomical system on theoretical grounds but also sought reconciliation with it. Ibn al-Haytham developed a physical structure of the Ptolemaic system in his Treatise on the configuration of the World, or Maqâlah fî hay'at al-‛âlam, which became an influential work in the hay'a tradition. In his Epitome of Astronomy, he insisted that the heavenly bodies "were accountable to the laws of physics."

In 1038, Ibn al-Haytham described the first non-Ptolemaic configuration in The Model of the Motions. His reform was not concerned with cosmology, as he developed a systematic study of celestial kinematics that was completely geometric. This in turn led to innovative developments in infinitesimal geometry. His reformed model was the first to reject the equant and eccentrics, separate natural philosophy from astronomy, free celestial kinematics from cosmology, and reduce physical entities to geometrical entities. The model also propounded the Earth's rotation about its axis, and the centres of motion were geometrical points without any physical significance, like Johannes Kepler's model centuries later.

In 1030, Abū al-Rayhān al-Bīrūnī discussed the Indian planetary theories of Aryabhata, Brahmagupta and Varahamihira in his Ta'rikh al-Hind (Latinized as Indica). Al-Biruni agreed with the Earth's rotation about its own axis, and while he was initially neutral regarding the heliocentric and geocentric models, he eventually came to reject heliocentrism towards the end of his life. He remarked that if the Earth rotates on its axis and moves around the Sun, it would remain consistent with his astronomical parameters:

"Rotation of the earth would in no way invalidate astronomical calculations, for all the astronomical data are as explicable in terms of the one theory as of the other. The problem is thus difficult of solution."

=== Andalusian Revolt ===
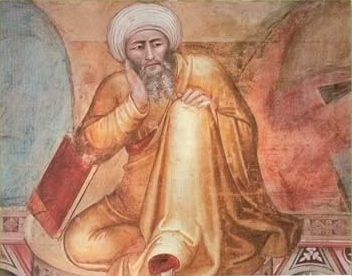
Averroes rejected the eccentric deferents introduced by Ptolemy. He rejected the Ptolemaic model and instead argued for a strictly concentric model of the universe.

In 1984, Abdelhamid Sabra coined the term "Andalusian Revolt" to describe an event beginning among twelfth century astronomers in al-Andalus where mounting discomfort over the conflicts between theory and observation resulted in astronomers transitioning away from the unquestioned authority of Ptolemy to rejecting his theory in favor of radically different solutions. Nur ad-Din al-Bitruji (d. 1204) rejected the existence of eccentrics and epicycles. Instead, the motions of the planets would be explained by concentric spheres, as explained in his (only extant) work al-Murtaʿish fī ʾl-hayʾa ("The Revolutionary Book on Astronomy"). The major figures of this "revolt" were, among the astronomers, Ibn al-Zarqālluh, Jābir b. al-Aflaḥ, and al-Biṭrūjī, and among the philosophers, Ibn Bājja (Avempace), Ibn Ṭufayl (the teacher of al-Biṭrūjī), Averroes, and Maimonides.

In the 12th century, Averroes rejected the eccentric deferents introduced by Ptolemy. He rejected the Ptolemaic model and instead argued for a strictly concentric model of the universe. He wrote the following criticism on the Ptolemaic model of planetary motion:

"To assert the existence of an eccentric sphere or an epicyclic sphere is contrary to nature. [...] The astronomy of our time offers no truth, but only agrees with the calculations and not with what exists."

Averroes' contemporary, Maimonides, wrote the following on the planetary model proposed by Ibn Bajjah (Avempace):

"I have heard that Abu Bakr [Ibn Bajja] discovered a system in which no epicycles occur, but eccentric spheres are not excluded by him. I have not heard it from his pupils; and even if it be correct that he discovered such a system, he has not gained much by it, for eccentricity is likewise contrary to the principles laid down by Aristotle.... I have explained to you that these difficulties do not concern the astronomer, for he does not profess to tell us the existing properties of the spheres, but to suggest, whether correctly or not, a theory in which the motion of the stars and planets is uniform and circular, and in agreement with observation."

Ibn Bajjah also proposed the Milky Way galaxy to be made up of many stars but that it appears to be a continuous image due to the effect of refraction in the Earth's atmosphere. Later in the 12th century, his successors Ibn Tufail and Nur Ed-Din Al Betrugi (Alpetragius) were the first to propose planetary models without any equant, epicycles or eccentrics. Their configurations, however, were not accepted due to the numerical predictions of the planetary positions in their models being less accurate than that of the Ptolemaic model, mainly because they followed Aristotle's notion of perfectly uniform circular motion.

=== Maragha Revolution ===
The "Maragha Revolution" refers to the Maragheh school's revolution against Ptolemaic astronomy in response to the critiques produced by Ibn al-Haytham and the new research programme he introduced. The "Maragha school" was an astronomical tradition beginning in the Maragheh observatory and continuing with astronomers from Damascus and Samarkand, with the most significance influence by Ibn al-Shatir. Like their Andalusian predecessors, the Maragha astronomers attempted to solve the equant problem and produce alternative configurations to the Ptolemaic model. They were more successful than their Andalusian predecessors in producing non-Ptolemaic configurations which eliminated the equant and eccentrics. The most important of the Maragha astronomers included Mo'ayyeduddin Urdi (d. 1266), Nasīr al-Dīn al-Tūsī (1201–1274), Najm al-Dīn al-Qazwīnī al-Kātibī (d. 1277), Qutb al-Din al-Shirazi (1236–1311), Sadr al-Sharia al-Bukhari (c. 1347), Ibn al-Shatir (1304–1375), Ali Qushji (c. 1474), al-Birjandi (d. 1525) and Shams al-Din al-Khafri (d. 1550).

Some have described their achievements in the 13th and 14th centuries as a "Maragha Revolution", "Maragha School Revolution", or "Scientific Revolution before the Renaissance". An important aspect of this revolution included the realization that astronomy should aim to describe the behavior of physical bodies in mathematical language, and should not remain a mathematical hypothesis, which would only save the phenomena. The Maragha astronomers also realized that the Aristotelian view of motion in the universe being only circular or linear was not true, as the Tusi-couple showed that linear motion could also be produced by applying circular motions only.

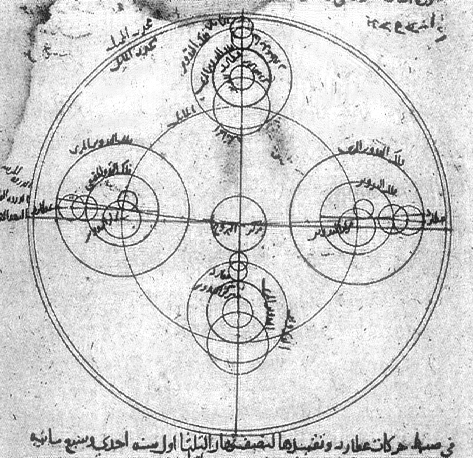
Ibn al-Shatir's model for the appearances of Mercury, showing the multiplication of epicycles using the Tusi-couple, thus eliminating the Ptolemaic eccentrics and equant.

Other achievements of the Maragha school include the observational evidences for the Earth's rotation on its axis by al-Tusi and Qushji (though this was rejected by their colleagues), the separation of natural philosophy from astronomy by Ibn al-Shatir and Qushji, the rejection of the Ptolemaic model on empirical rather than philosophical grounds by Ibn al-Shatir, and the development of mathematically identical models to the heliocentric Copernical model (though they remained geocentric).

Mo'ayyeduddin Urdi (d. 1266) was the first of the Maragheh astronomers to develop a non-Ptolemaic model, and he proposed a new theorem, the "Urdi lemma". Nasīr al-Dīn al-Tūsī (1201–1274) resolved significant problems in the Ptolemaic system by developing the Tusi-couple as an alternative to the physically problematic equant introduced by Ptolemy for every planet except Mercury. Ibn al-Shatir was able to extend this result to Mercury as well. Ibn al-Shatir (1304–1375) of Damascus, in A Final Inquiry Concerning the Rectification of Planetary Theory, based on a number of issues he recognized in Ptolemy's model of the sun on the basis of observations (including his own), devised a new solar model.

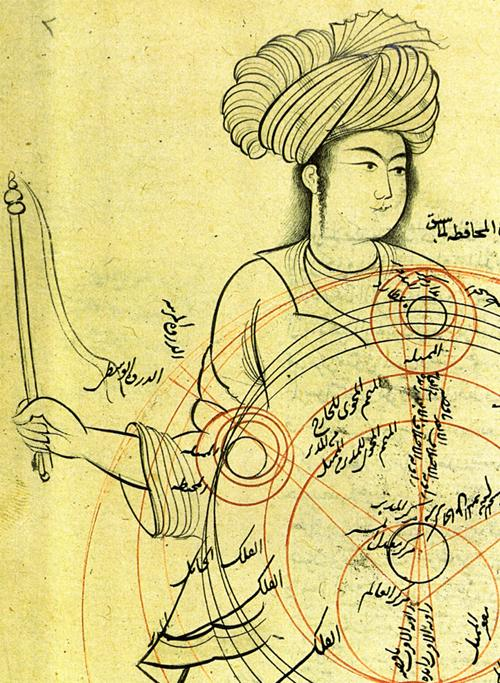
Medieval manuscript by Qutb al-Din al-Shirazi depicting an epicyclic planetary model.

An area of active discussion in the Maragheh school, and later the Samarkand and Istanbul observatories, was the possibility of the Earth's rotation. Supporters of this theory included Nasīr al-Dīn al-Tūsī, Nizam al-Din al-Nisaburi (c. 1311), al-Sayyid al-Sharif al-Jurjani (1339–1413), Ali Qushji (d. 1474), and Abd al-Ali al-Birjandi (d. 1525). Al-Tusi was the first to present empirical observational evidence of the Earth's rotation, using the location of comets relevant to the Earth as evidence, which Qushji elaborated on with further empirical observations while rejecting Aristotelian natural philosophy altogether. Both of their arguments were similar to the arguments later used by Nicolaus Copernicus in 1543 to explain the Earth's rotation (see Astronomical physics and Earth's motion section below).

=== Experimental astrophysics and celestial mechanics ===
In the 9th century, the eldest Banū Mūsā brother, Ja'far Muhammad ibn Mūsā ibn Shākir, made significant contributions to Islamic astrophysics and celestial mechanics. He was the first to hypothesize that the heavenly bodies and celestial spheres are subject to the same laws of physics as Earth, unlike the ancients who believed that the celestial spheres followed their own set of physical laws different from that of Earth.

In the early 11th century, Ibn al-Haytham (Alhazen) wrote the Maqala fi daw al-qamar (On the Light of the Moon) some time before 1021. He combined Aristotelian physics with the ancient mathematics (astronomy and optics). He disproved the universally held opinion that the Moon reflects sunlight and correctly concluded that it "emits light from those portions of its surface which the sun's light strikes." In order to prove that "light is emitted from every point of the Moon's illuminated surface," he built an "ingenious experimental device." Ibn al-Haytham had "formulated a clear conception of the relationship between an ideal mathematical model and the complex of observable phenomena; in particular, he was the first to make a systematic use of the method of varying the experimental conditions in a constant and uniform manner, in an experiment showing that the intensity of the light-spot formed by the projection of the moonlight through two small apertures onto a screen diminishes constantly as one of the apertures is gradually blocked up." Ibn al-Haytham, in his Book of Optics (1021) also suggested that heaven, the location of the fixed stars, was less dense than air.

In the 12th century, Fakhr al-Din al-Razi participated in the debate among Islamic scholars over whether the celestial spheres or orbits (falak) are "to be considered as real, concrete physical bodies" or "merely the abstract circles in the heavens traced out year in and year out by the various stars and planets." He points out that many astronomers prefer to see them as solid spheres "on which the stars turn," while others, such as the Islamic scholar Dahhak, view the celestial sphere as "not a body but merely the abstract orbit traced by the stars." Al-Razi himself remains "undecided as to which celestial models, concrete or abstract, most conform with external reality," and notes that "there is no way to ascertain the characteristics of the heavens," whether by "observable" evidence or by authority (al-khabar) of "divine revelation or prophetic traditions." He concludes that "astronomical models, whatever their utility or lack thereof for ordering the heavens, are not founded on sound rational proofs, and so no intellectual commitment can be made to them insofar as description and explanation of celestial realities are concerned."

The theologian Adud al-Din al-Iji (1281–1355), under the influence of the Ash'ari doctrine of occasionalism, which maintained that all physical effects were caused directly by God's will rather than by natural causes, rejected the Aristotelian principle of an innate principle of circular motion in the heavenly bodies, and maintained that the celestial spheres were "imaginary things" and "more tenuous than a spider's web". His views were challenged by al-Jurjani (1339–1413), who argued that even if the celestial spheres "do not have an external reality, yet they are things that are correctly imagined and correspond to what [exists] in actuality".

=== Astronomical physics and Earth's motion ===
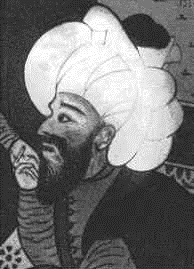
Ali Qushji provided empirical evidence for the Earth's motion and developed an astronomical physics independent from Aristotelian physics and natural philosophy.

The work of Ali Qushji (d. 1474), who worked at Samarkand and then Istanbul, is seen as a late example of innovation in Islamic theoretical astronomy and it is believed he may have possibly had some influence on Nicolaus Copernicus due to similar arguments concerning the Earth's rotation. Before Qushji, the only astronomer to present empirical evidence for the Earth's rotation was Nasīr al-Dīn al-Tūsī (d. 1274), who used the phenomena of comets to refute Ptolemy's claim that a stationary Earth can be determined through observation. Al-Tusi, however, eventually accepted that the Earth was stationary on the basis of Aristotelian cosmology and natural philosophy. By the 15th century, the influence of Aristotelian physics and natural philosophy was declining due to religious opposition from Islamic theologians such as Al-Ghazali who opposed to the interference of Aristotelianism in astronomy, opening up possibilities for an astronomy unrestrained by philosophy. Under this influence, Qushji, in his Concerning the Supposed Dependence of Astronomy upon Philosophy, rejected Aristotelian physics and completely separated natural philosophy from astronomy, allowing astronomy to become a purely empirical and mathematical science. This allowed him to explore alternatives to the Aristotelian notion of a stationary Earth, as he explored the idea of a moving Earth. He also observed comets and elaborated on al-Tusi's argument. He took it a step further and concluded, on the basis of empirical evidence rather than speculative philosophy, that the moving Earth theory is just as likely to be true as the stationary Earth theory and that it is not possible to empirically deduce which theory is true. His work was an important step away from Aristotelian physics and towards an independent astronomical physics.

Despite the similarity in their discussions regarding the Earth's motion, there is uncertainty over whether Qushji had any influence on Copernicus. However, it is likely that they both may have arrived at similar conclusions due to using the earlier work of al-Tusi as a basis. This is more of a possibility considering "the remarkable coincidence between a passage in De revolutionibus (I.8) and one in Ṭūsī's Tadhkira (II.1[6]) in which Copernicus follows Ṭūsī's objection to Ptolemy's "proofs" of the Earth's immobility." This can be considered as evidence that not only was Copernicus influenced by the mathematical models of Islamic astronomers, but may have also been influenced by the astronomical physics they began developing and their views on the Earth's motion.

In the 16th century, the debate on the Earth's motion was continued by al-Birjandi (d. 1528), who in his analysis of what might occur if the Earth were moving, develops a hypothesis similar to Galileo Galilei's notion of "circular inertia", which he described in the following observational test (as a response to one of Qutb al-Din al-Shirazi's arguments):

"The small or large rock will fall to the Earth along the path of a line that is perpendicular to the plane (sath) of the horizon; this is witnessed by experience (tajriba). And this perpendicular is away from the tangent point of the Earth's sphere and the plane of the perceived (hissi) horizon. This point moves with the motion of the Earth and thus there will be no difference in place of fall of the two rocks."

== See also ==
- Sufi cosmology
- Astronomy in the medieval Islamic world
- Baháʼí cosmology
- Buddhist cosmology
- Biblical cosmology
- Hindu cosmology
- Jain cosmology
- Religious cosmology
- Arcs of Descent and Ascent
