= Persse =

Persse is a surname. Notable people with the surname include:

- Atty Persse (1869–1960), Champion English racehorse trainer
- Dudley Persse (1625–1699), Anglo-Irish landlord
- Henry Persse (1885–1918), English cricketer
- Henry Stratford Persse (died 1833), Irish writer
- Isabella Augusta Persse (best known as Lady Gregory; 1852–1932), Anglo-Irish playwright, poet, translator and chatelaine
- Lee-Ann Persse (born 1988), South African rower
- Sarah Persse (fl. 1899), Irish women's rights activist
- William Persse (c. 1728–1802), Irish volunteer

== See also ==
- Perse (disambiguation)
