= Latin tag =

Conventional Latin phrase

A Latin tag is a Latin phrase or expression conventionally used in the English language, either in ordinary speech and writing or as terminology associated with specific fields such as law, medicine, logic, administration, religion, and scholarship. Some occur as complete phrases, sayings or maxims, while others primarily appear in an abbreviated form.

Many Latin tags have become substantially incorporated into the English language, with examples in widespread use including ad hoc, ad infinitum, ad nauseam, bona fide, de facto and de jure, per capita, per se, prima facie, quid pro quo, sine qua non, status quo, and vice versa, while many others remain principally associated with particular professions, scholarly writing, formal discourse, mottos, or the like.

Latin tags have historically been associated with education and learned discourse. The Concise Oxford Companion to the English Language reports that they were widely used up to about the mid-20th century, sometimes deliberately as a signal of the user's education. As this practice declined, less familiar tags became less common and less widely understood, and their use has come to be regarded as affected or unnecessary.

Examples of expressions that have become firmly established in particular fields include habeas corpus, and sub judice in law; locum tenens, placebo, and post mortem in medicine; argumentum ad hominem, non sequitur, and reductio ad absurdum in logic; and ad hoc, quorum, and sine die in administration. Latin also survives in numerous conventional scholarly abbreviations, particularly those used with respect to citation, such as ibid. (an abbreviation for the Latin word ibīdem, meaning 'in the same place'), op. cit. (an abbreviation of the Latin phrase opus citatum or opere citato), (meaning 'the work cited' or 'in the cited work', respectively), passim (meaning here and there, or, everywhere), cf. (for Latin confer or conferatur, both meaning 'compare'), e.g. (exempli gratia), and i.e. (id est).

== Survival in modern usage ==
The continued use of Latin tags is part of a broader survival of Latin in modern European languages after Latin ceased to be the principal international language of education and scholarship. Latin had served for centuries as a common language of learning and was particularly important in scientific and medical communication. In early modern Europe it was used internationally in fields including natural philosophy, mathematics, medicine, chemistry, and natural history, before increasingly giving way to vernacular languages during the 18th and 19th centuries.

Even as continuous discourse in Latin declined, individual Latin expressions remained embedded in other languages. Fixed expressions such as dramatis personae, habeas corpus, and casus belli continued to be used in their Latin form, while other expressions became established within particular professions or entered more general vocabulary. This retention of fixed expressions alongside specialized terminology accounts for much of the continuing presence of Latin in modern English.

== Styling ==
Style guides disagree on whether Latin phrases like ad hoc should be italicized. The trend is not to use italics. For example, The Chicago Manual of Style recommends that familiar Latin phrases that are listed in the Webster's Dictionary, including "ad hoc", not be italicized.

The distinction generally turns on the degree to which an expression has become naturalized in English. Legal scholar and lexicographer Bryan A. Garner recommends roman type for Latin terms sufficiently established to be regarded as anglicized, while retaining italics for expressions still treated as foreignisms. The Chicago Manual of Style likewise states that familiar Latin terms are generally set in roman type. In legal writing, the Maroonbook similarly treats commonly used Latin words and phrases as part of common English usage and ordinarily does not italicize them, while retaining italics for obsolete or uncommon expressions.

== Usage in connection with specific fields ==
=== Scientific and medical Latin ===
Latin maintains a particularly persistent role in scientific and medical terminology, having been widely used for scientific and medical writing in early modern Europe. This influence continued after vernacular languages largely displaced it as the language of scientific communication, with Latin remaining important in areas including binomial nomenclature in biology, anatomical nomenclature, and pharmaceutical terminology.

These continuing technical uses are not necessarily themselves Latin tags: the scientific name of an organism, for example, functions as nomenclature rather than as a fixed Latin expression inserted into English discourse. The same scientific and medical traditions, however, have preserved numerous Latin expressions that do function as English tags. The Concise Oxford Companion to the English Language gives locum tenens, placebo, and post mortem as examples firmly established in medical usage. Latin phrases and abbreviations also remain in medical prescriptions, including such forms as p.r.n. (pro re nata, "as needed") and p.o. (per os, "by mouth").

=== Law Latin ===
Latin tags have also had an especially persistent role in legal usage, with Law Latin being used as a term for Latin legal vocabulary as well as for a distinctive form of Latin historically employed in English legal records and instruments. Law Latin, sometimes written L.L. or L. Lat., and sometimes derisively referred to as Dog Latin, is a form of Latin used in legal contexts. Some of the vocabulary stems from English, and Law Latin may also be seen as consisting of a mixture of English, French and Latin words superimposed over an English syntax.

Law Latin was the language in which the records of English lawsuits and other causes at law (as distinguished from those at equity and in other prerogative tribunals) were recorded at least until the reign of George II. Under his reign, the Proceedings in Courts of Justice Act 1730 (effective from 1733) mandated that all records of legal proceedings in England were to be made in English rather than Latin. Law Latin was also used as the language of writs, royal charters, letters patent and many other legal instruments. As late as 1867, Law Latin was still in use in England and Scotland for some legal instruments. In South Africa, knowledge of Latin was a requirement in order to join the General Council of the Bar in order to advocate in the courts until 1988 when it was abolished.

== Common expressions ==
=== Ad hoc ===
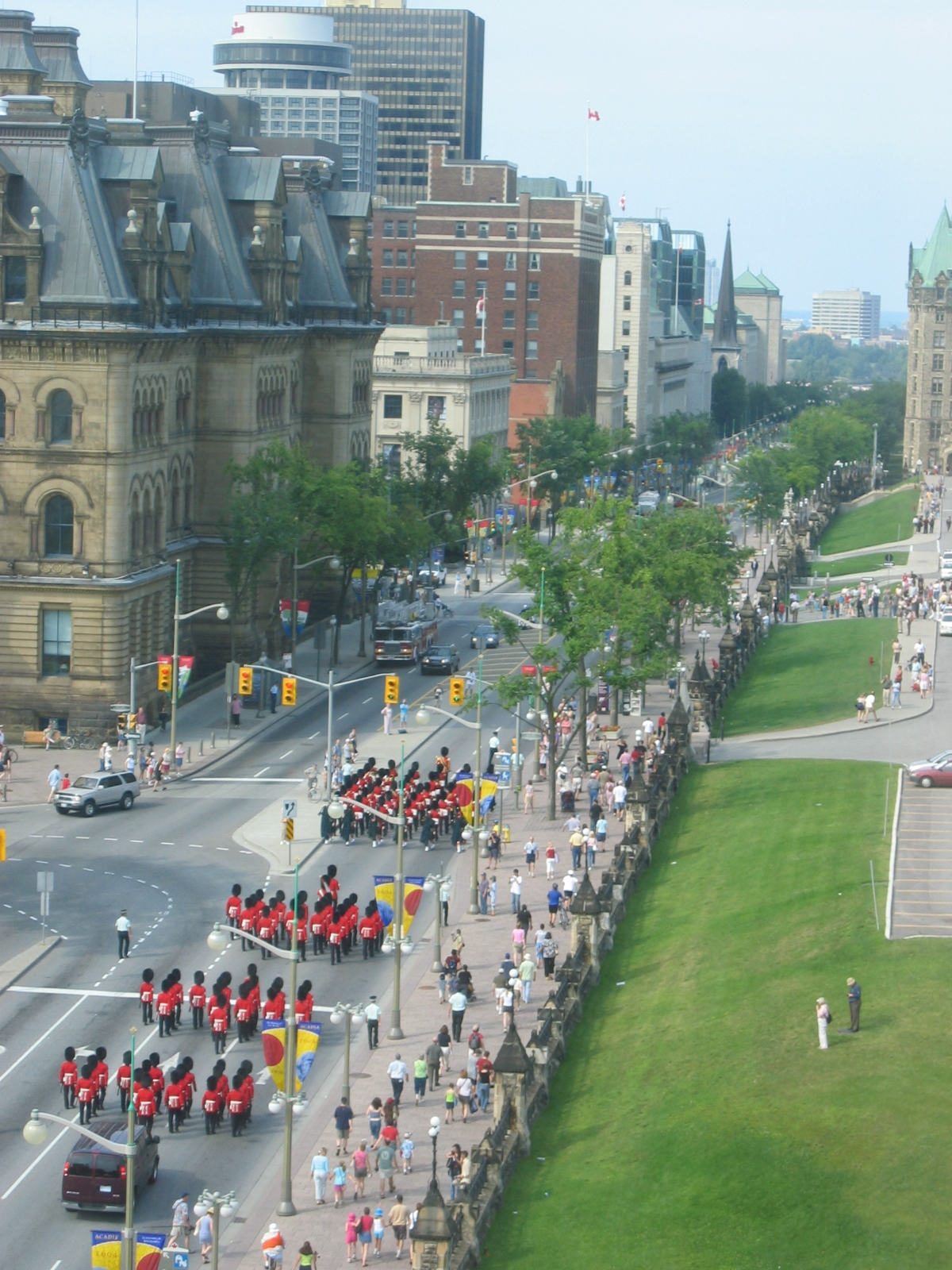
The Ceremonial Guard, here parading in Ottawa, is an ad hoc unit of the Canadian Forces

Ad hoc, meaning literally "for this", is typically used in English to signify a solution designed for a specific purpose, problem, or task rather than a generalized solution adaptable to collateral instances (compare with a priori). Common examples include ad hoc committees and commissions created at the national or international level for a specific task, and the term is often used to describe arbitration (ad hoc arbitration). In other fields, the term could refer to a military unit created under special circumstances (see task force), a handcrafted network protocol (e.g., ad hoc network), a temporary collaboration among geographically linked franchise locations (of a given national brand) to issue advertising coupons, or a purpose-specific equation in mathematics or science.

Ad hoc can also function as an adjective describing temporary, provisional, or improvised methods to deal with a particular problem, the tendency of which has given rise to the noun adhocism. This concept highlights the flexibility and adaptability often required in problem-solving across various domains. In everyday language, "ad hoc" is sometimes used informally to describe improvised or makeshift solutions, emphasizing their temporary nature and specific applicability to immediate circumstances.

In science and philosophy, ad hoc typically means the addition of extra hypotheses to a theory to save it from being falsified. An ad hoc hypothesis compensates for anomalies not anticipated by the theory in its unmodified form. Scientists are often skeptical of scientific theories that rely on frequent, unsupported adjustments to sustain them. Ad hoc hypotheses are often characteristic of pseudo-scientific subjects such as homeopathy. A wireless ad hoc network typically refers to a system of network elements that combine to form a network requiring little or no planning.

In national and sub-national governance, ad hoc bodies may be established to deal with specific problems not easily accommodated by the current structure of governance or to address multi-faceted issues spanning several areas of governance. In the UK and other commonwealth countries, ad hoc Royal Commissions may be set up to address specific questions as directed by parliament. In the military, ad hoc units are created during unpredictable situations, when the cooperation between different units is suddenly needed for fast action, or from remnants of previous units which have been overrun or otherwise whittled down. In diplomacy, diplomats may be appointed by a government as special envoys, or diplomats who serve on an ad hoc basis due to the possibility that such envoys' offices may either not be retained by a future government or may only exist during the duration of a relevant cause.

=== Ad infinitum ===
Ad infinitum, meaning "to infinity" or "forevermore", is usually used to mean "continue forever, without limit", which can be used to describe a non-terminating process, a non-terminating repeating process, or a set of instructions to be repeated "forever," among other uses. It may also be used in a manner similar to the Latin phrase et cetera to denote written words or a concept that continues for a lengthy period beyond what is shown. Examples include:

- "The sequence 1, 2, 3, ... continues ad infinitum."
- "The perimeter of a fractal may be iteratively drawn ad infinitum."

The 17th-century writer Jonathan Swift incorporated the idea of self-similarity in the following lines from his satirical poem On Poetry: a Rhapsody (1733):

The vermin only teaze and pinch
Their foes superior by an inch.
So, naturalists observe, a flea
Has smaller fleas that on him prey;
And these have smaller still to bite 'em,
And so proceed ad infinitum.
Thus every poet, in his kind,
Is bit by him that comes behind

The mathematician Augustus De Morgan included similar lines in his rhyme Siphonaptera.

=== Ad libitum (or Ad lib) ===
Ad libitum (/æd ˈlɪbɪtəm/; Latin for 'at one's pleasure' or 'as you desire'), often shortened to "ad lib" (as an adjective or adverb) or "ad-lib" (as a verb or noun), refers to various forms of improvisation, often in music and other performing arts. The phrase "at liberty" is often associated mnemonically (because of the alliteration of the lib- syllable), although it is not the translation (there is no cognation between libitum and liber). Libido is the etymologically closer cognate known in English.

In sheet music, ad libitum indicates that the performer or conductor has any of a variety of types of discretion with respect to a given passage. In hip-hop, ad-libs are commonly used to accent certain words in a bar. One of the most famous examples of American record producer DJ Khaled, who is known to shout phrases such as "We the best music!" or "Another one!" in his songs. The ad-libs of a producer can also act as producer tags for the producers themselves, which is again seen in DJ Khaled's records. It should be noted, however, that the role of ad-libs is not limited to the producer, and rappers using their own ad-libs is just as if not more prevalent.

"Ad-lib" is particularly used to describe individual moments during live theatre when an actor speaks through their character using words not found in the play's text. In film, the term usually refers to the interpolation of unscripted material in an otherwise scripted performance. For example, in interviews, Dustin Hoffman says he ad-libbed the now famous line, "I'm walking here! I'm walking here!" as "Ratso" Rizzo in Midnight Cowboy (1969).

In biology and nutrition, the phrase is used to describe feeding without restriction.

=== Ad nauseam ===
Ad nauseam is used to describe an argument or a discussion that has been extended to the figurative point of nausea. For example, "this has been discussed ad nauseam" indicates that the topic has been discussed extensively and those involved have grown sick of it. The fallacy of dragging the conversation to an ad nauseam state in order to then assert one's position as correct due to it not having been contradicted is also called argumentum ad infinitum (to infinity) and "argument from repetition". The term is defined by the American Heritage Dictionary as "to a disgusting or ridiculous degree; to the point of nausea". Colloquially, it is sometimes used as "until nobody cares to discuss it any more".

The phrase originates as a Latin expression, translating to "to nausea", combining the preposition ad ("to") with nauseam the accusative case of nausea ("nausea" or "seasickness"). This term nausea traces back to Ancient Greek nausía, denoting "seasickness" and stemming from naûs ("ship"). In English, the phrase appeared during the mid 16th century. The earliest documented instance occurs in a 1565 translation by John Hall, where it describes continuation to the point of inducing disgust. By 1644, usage had become more established, often meaning excessive repetition that leads to weariness. During the 17th century, the expression got higher usage in English literature and discourse, particularly for critiquing repetitive debates or ideas.

=== Antebellum ===
Antebellum, literally "before the war", is used in English as an adjective for a period preceding a war, and has particularly come to refer to the period before the American Civil War. In American usage it has become especially associated with the pre-Civil War South, as in such expressions as "antebellum society", "antebellum slavery", and "antebellum architecture". Oxford notes that in the United States the word is particularly used for large Southern houses constructed before the Civil War.

The modern English word developed during the Civil War era from the expression ante bellum, "before the war". Literary scholar Cody Marrs traces both ante-bellum and its counterpart post-bellum to the terminology of international law, in which they initially served as shortened forms of status quo ante bellum ("the state before the war") and status quo post bellum ("the state after the war"). After entering the American vernacular in the 1860s and 1870s, the shortened terms were typically hyphenated and italicized as linguistic imports; they subsequently became established as English periodizing terms.

The resulting usage is retrospective: a period can only be identified as antebellum once a war signifying its end has begun. Marrs observes that antebellum and postbellum are now used as names for discrete historical eras, rather than principally in their earlier international-law sense. Although dictionaries retain the general meaning "before a war", they commonly identify the American Civil War as the predominant or especially characteristic reference.

=== Bona fide ===
Bona fides is a Latin phrase meaning "good faith". Its ablative case is bona fide, meaning "in good faith", which is often used in English as an adjective to mean "genuine". Some Latin phrases have lost their literal meaning over centuries, but bona fides is still widely used and interchangeable with its generally accepted modern-day English translation of good faith. While fides may be translated as "faith", it embraces a range of meanings within a core concept of "reliability", in the sense of a trust between two parties for the potentiality of a relationship. For the ancient Romans, bona fides was to be assumed by both sides, with implied responsibilities and both legal and religious consequences if broken. According to Roman law, "bona fides requires that what has been agreed upon be done" and was the principle of acting with integrity. Fides was one of the original virtues to be considered a divinity in ancient Roman religion.

In contemporary English, bona fides is synonymous with credentials and identity. The phrase is sometimes used in job advertisements, and should not be confused with the bona fide occupational qualifications or the employer's good faith effort, as described below.

=== De facto and de jure ===
De facto and de jure are contrasting concepts, with de facto being used to refer to the actual existence of a state of affairs, and de jure being used to refer to the legal existence of something even if it is not represented in reality. These terms are particularly used in the context of law and governance. For example, the de facto ruler of a country is the individual who actually runs the government, and the de jure leader may merely be a legal office holder with little power.

In jurisprudence, a de facto law (also known as a de facto regulation) is a law or regulation that is followed but "is not specifically enumerated by a law." By definition, de facto 'contrasts' de jure which means "as defined by law" or "as a matter of law." For example, if a particular law exists in one jurisdiction, but is followed in another where it has no legal effect (such as in another country), then the law could be considered a de facto regulation (a "de facto regulation" is not an officially prescribed legal classification for a type of law in a particular jurisdiction, rather, it is a concept about law(s).

A de facto regulation may be followed by an organization as a result of the market size of the jurisdiction imposing the regulation as a proportion of the overall market; wherein the market share is so large that it results in the organization choosing to comply by implementing one standard of business with respect to the given de facto law instead of altering standards between different jurisdictions and markets (e.g. data protection, manufacturing, etc.).

=== Et cetera ===
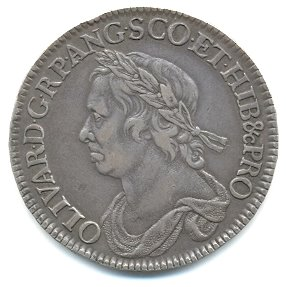
The &c (et ceterarum, "Protector of England, Scotland and Ireland and another") shows that Oliver Cromwell did not renounce the English claims on France

Et cetera, abbreviated to etc. or et cet., is used in English to mean "and all the rest". The ampersand "&" is a ligature of "et", thus it can also be abbreviated &c. . Translated literally from Latin, et can mean 'and', while cētĕra can mean 'the rest'; thus, the expression translates to 'and the rest'.

Et cetera is a calque (loanword/phrase) of the Koine Greek καὶ τὰ ἕτερα (kai ta hetera) meaning 'and the other things'. The typical Modern Greek form is και τα λοιπά (kai ta loipá) 'and the remainder'. The one-word spelling etcetera appears in at least one dictionary. The abbreviated form &c. or &c is still occasionally used—the ampersand ⟨&⟩, derives from a ligature of et. The phrase et cetera is often used to denote the logical continuation of some sort of series of descriptions. For example, in the following expression:

We will need a lot of bread: wheat, granary, wholemeal, etc. on our menu.

In this case of a use at the end of a list without conjunction, a comma is typically written in front of the phrase (but see Serial comma). If etc. is used at the end of a sentence, the dot is not doubled. If it occurs at the end of exclamations, questions or a clause, the dot is not suppressed but followed by whatever punctuation marks are required to end or continue the sentence.

=== Mea culpa ===
Mea culpa means my fault or my mistake, and is an acknowledgment of having done wrong. The expression is also used as an admission of having made a mistake that should have been avoided and, in a religious context, may be accompanied by symbolically beating the breast when uttering the words. The phrase comes from a Western Christian prayer of confession of sinfulness, known as the Confiteor, used in the Roman Rite at the beginning of Mass or when receiving the sacrament of Penance. Grammatically, meā culpā is in the ablative case, with an instrumental meaning.

Geoffrey Chaucer's 14th-century Troilus and Criseyde uses it in a way that shows it was then already a traditional religious phrase: "Now, mea culpa, lord! I me repente." Although the Confiteor was not then part of the Mass, it was used in administering the sacrament of Penance. In some forms it already included the phrase mea culpa. Thus the 9th-century Paenitentiale Vallicellanum II had a thrice-repeated mea culpa (without maxima) in its elaborate form of the Confiteor. In about 1220, the rite of public penance in Siena for those who had committed murder required the penitent to throw himself on the ground three times, saying: Mea culpa; peccavi; Domine miserere mei ("Through my fault. I have sinned. Lord, have mercy on me").

=== Per capita ===
Per capita, literally meaning "by heads" or "for each head", and idiomatically used to mean "per person", is used in a wide variety of social sciences and statistical research contexts, including government statistics, economic indicators, and built environment studies.

It is commonly used in the field of statistics in place of saying "per person" (although per caput is the Latin for "per head").

It is also used in wills to indicate that each of the named beneficiaries should receive, by bequest or devise, equal shares of the estate. This is in contrast to a per stirpes division, in which each branch (Latin: stirps, pl.: stirpes) of the inheriting family inherits an equal share of the estate. This is often used with the '2-0 rule', a statistical principle that determines which group is larger per capita. Under the 2-0 rule, a group is the largest per capita if it has both the biggest total size and size of the group of the objects in question, therefore resulting in a 2-0 score.

=== Per se ===
Per se means "by itself" or "in itself", used in English to indicate that something is being considered independently of other circumstances or associated factors.

The phrase entered English during the 16th century. Collins English Dictionary dates its English use to approximately 1565–1575, and it was sufficiently established by the beginning of the 17th century to be used by William Shakespeare in Troilus and Cressida, where Alexander describes Ajax as "a very man per se, / And stands alone".

Per se has become particularly well established in legal English, where it may indicate that a legal consequence follows from the nature of an act itself rather than from additional surrounding circumstances. The Legal Information Institute gives the general legal meaning as "by itself" or "inherently". In the law of torts, for example, negligence per se may arise when violation of a statute establishes breach of a duty of care without the plaintiff separately proving that element of negligence.

=== Quid pro quo ===
Quid pro quo (Renaissance Latin: 'something for something') is a Latin phrase used in English to mean an exchange of goods or services, in which one transfer is contingent upon the other; "a favor for a favor". In American English it is a euphemism for financial crime. Phrases with similar meanings include: "give and take", "tit for tat", "you scratch my back, and I'll scratch yours", "this for that," and "one hand washes the other". Other languages use do ut des (literally 'I give so that you may give') to express a reciprocal exchange, which aligns with the Latin meaning, whereas the widespread use of quid pro quo in English for this concept actually means "misunderstanding" in Latin, or “mistaking something for something else”.

The Latin phrase quid pro quo originally implied that something had been substituted, meaning "something for something" as in I gave you sugar for salt. Early usage by English speakers followed the original Latin meaning, with occurrences in the 1530s where the term referred to substituting one medicine for another, whether unintentionally or fraudulently. By the end of the same century, quid pro quo evolved into a more current use to describe equivalent exchanges.

In 1654, the expression quid pro quo was used to generally refer to something done for personal gain or with the expectation of reciprocity in the text The Reign of King Charles: An History Disposed into Annalls, with a somewhat positive connotation. It refers to the covenant with Christ as something "that prove not a nudum pactum, a naked contract, without quid pro quo." Believers in Christ have to do their part in return, namely "foresake the devil and all his works".

Quid pro quo would go on to be used, by English speakers in legal and diplomatic contexts, as an exchange of equally valued goods or services and continues to be today. The Latin phrase actually corresponding to the English usage of quid pro quo is do ut des (Latin for "I give, so that you may give"). Other languages continue to use do ut des for this purpose, while quid pro quo (or its equivalent qui pro quo, as widely used in Italian, French, Spanish and Portuguese) still keeps its original meaning of something being unwittingly mistaken, or erroneously told or understood, instead of something else.

=== Sine qua non ===
A sine qua non (/ˌsaɪni kweɪ ˈnɒn, ˌsɪni kwɑː ˈnoʊn/, Latin: [ˈsɪnɛ kʷaː ˈnoːn]) or condicio sine qua non (plural: condiciones sine quibus non) is an indispensable and essential action, condition, or ingredient. It was originally a Latin legal term for "[a condition] without which it could not be", "but for...", or "without which [there is] nothing." Also, "sine qua non causation" is the formal terminology for "but-for causation." As a Latin term, it occurs in the work of Boethius and originated in Aristotelian expressions. In Classical Latin, the form uses the word condicio (from the verb condico, condicere, to agree upon), but in later Latin the phrase is also used with conditio, an error in translation as conditio means construction and not condition.

It has passed from a merely legal usage to a more general usage in many languages, including English, German, French, Italian and Spanish. US President Andrew Jackson once gave a toast on the occasion of his receiving an honorary doctorate from Harvard University, responding to his listeners, "E pluribus unum, my friends. Sine qua non." In 1938, Jomo Kenyatta, the general secretary of the Kikuyu Central Association and who later became Kenya's first prime minister, wrote that the institution of female genital mutilation was the "condicio sine qua non of the whole teaching of tribal law, religion and morality". He was writing in the context of the missionaries' campaign against female genital mutilation to assert the importance of the rite of passage as an ethnic marker for the Kikuyu, the main ethnic group in Kenya.

The phrase appears in the 1938 book on Dahomey culture by Melville J. Herskovits. He wrote about the need to learn the native language: "This does not mean that a knowledge of a native language is a sine qua non in the study of all problems bearing on primitive cultures. By the use of interpreters and of well recognized and tested techniques, it is possible to obtain the information needed to discover, describe and understand the institutions of a people, and it is such techniques that have been employed in this study."

In medicine, the term sine qua non (in contrast with pathognomonic) is often used in regard to any sign, symptom, or finding whose absence would very likely mean absence of the target disease or condition. The test for such a sign, symptom, or finding would thereby have very high sensitivity and thus would rarely miss the condition and so a negative result should be reassuring since the disease being tested for is absent. In legal matters, "but-for", "sine qua non", causa sine qua non, or "cause-in-fact" causation, or condicio sine qua non, is a circumstance in which a certain act is a material cause of a certain injury or wrongdoing, without which the injury would not have occurred. It is established by the "but-for" test: but for the act having occurred, the injury would not have happened.

=== Status quo ===
Status quo means the existing state of affairs, particularly with regard to social, economic, legal, environmental, political, religious, scientific or military issues. In the sociological sense, the status quo refers to the current state of social structure or values. With regard to policy debate, it means how conditions are contrasted with a possible change. For example: "The countries are now trying to maintain the status quo with regard to their nuclear arsenals." To maintain the status quo is to keep things the way they presently are. The related phrase status quo ante, literally 'the status before', refers to the state of affairs that existed previously.

The status quo may be changed via social movements. These seek to alleviate or prevent a particular issue and often to shape social feeling and cultural expression of a society or nation. Advocating to improve the status quo is a persuasive rhetorical device. This is sometimes critiqued as a policy of deliberate ambiguity as not formalizing or defining the adverse situation.

Economist Clark Kerr reportedly said: "The status quo is the only solution that cannot be vetoed." Karl Marx viewed organized religion as a means for the bourgeoisie to keep the proletariat content with an unequal status quo.

=== Vice versa ===
Vice versa (Note: Occasionally, "versa vice" is used as an ironic, autological subversion of this phrase.), literally meaning "with position turned", has thus evolved into an adverbial phrase meaning "with the order or relation reversed", or "the other way around", "conversely", et cetera. In ordinary English, this indicates a preceding statement also applying with principal terms reversed, so that a statement that one person affects another "and vice versa" indicates that the second person similarly affects the first; or, "from A to B or vice versa" includes movement from B to A. Dictionaries accordingly treat vice versa as an adverb. Historically, in British English, vice is pronounced as two syllables, but in American and Canadian English the singular-syllable pronunciation is almost universal. Classical Latin pronunciation dictates that the letter "c" is only a hard sound, like "k". Moreover, the letter "v", when consonantal, represents /w/; hence WEE-keh WEHR-sah.

The phrase was borrowed directly from Latin around the beginning of the 17th century. Collins English Dictionary dates its appearance in English to approximately 1595–1605, while the Oxford Advanced Learner's Dictionary dates it to the early 17th century.

== Latin terms lexicalized into English ==
The most assimilated end of the spectrum of Latin words and phrases are those that have become ordinary lexical items in English, perhaps having acquired a new part of speech or taken regular English inflections, and perhaps having developed new or additional meanings. Such forms may consequently function differently from Latin tags that remain recognizably foreign. For example, the word alias, from the Latin adverb aliās, meaning "otherwise" or "at another time", has come to be used in English as a noun for an assumed or alternative name, with a regular English plural, aliases, while retaining an adverbial use meaning "also known as". Similarly, Latin adverb alibī, meaning "elsewhere", has become English alibi, developed into a countable noun denoting evidence or a claim that a person was elsewhere when an event occurred, later acquiring the broader informal meaning of any excuse. It may also be used as a verb, with forms such as alibied and alibiing. Requiem, Latin 'for "rest", was first used in English to indicate the mass for the dead, and subsequently came to refer to a musical composition for such a service and, more generally, to music or other works commemorating the dead.

Phrases can undergo similar lexicalization. Alter ego, literally "other self", entered English in the 16th century and functions as an English countable noun for a second self, another aspect of a person's personality, or a close counterpart, with the usual English plural, alter egos. Other borrowings have retained approximately the same grammatical function, while becoming established English vocabulary. Ergo, Latin for "therefore", has been used in English since the late Middle Ages as a conjunction or adverb introducing a conclusion, particularly in logic-based argument. Versus entered Middle English through legal usage, derived from Latin versus, meaning "turned toward" or "against". In modern English, it functions as a preposition meaning "against", particularly in lawsuits and sporting contests, and more broadly to indicate a contrast or comparison between alternatives.

== Confusion with non-Latin terms ==
Latin is not the only historical source of foreign-language words and phrases retained in English, particularly in legal English. Common law terminology developed through use of both Latin and Law French, an Anglo-Norman professional language used by English lawyers over several centuries. Latin was used extensively for formal legal records, while Law French became the principal language of much common-law discourse from the 13th through the 17th centuries. Surviving English legal vocabulary derived from Law French includes such terms as voir dire, estoppel, jury, verdict, chattel, and trespass.

The coexistence of Latin and Law French terminology can make the historical origin of individual legal expressions less apparent. Voir dire, for example, an Anglo-Norman or Law French expression conventionally translated as "to speak the truth", is identified by the Administrative Office of the United States Courts as a French phrase. It has, however, sometimes been incorrectly identified as Latin, for example, in a voir dire script published by the United States District Court for the Northern District of Alabama, describing it to prospective jurors as "a Latin phrase". Other French-derived expressions and terms remain alongside Latin tags in modern legal usage.

== See also ==
- Ad hoc testing
- Ad libitum – Latin expression for "at one's pleasure"
- Adhocracy – Organization type characterized by minimal structure
- Dog Latin
- Latin influence in English
- Latinism
- List of Latin phrases
- Neo-Latin
