= Purse =

A purse is a small bag that may refer to:

- Coin purse, small pouch made for carrying coins
- Handbag, in North American English
- Money bag
- Wallet

Purse may also refer to:

- Purse (horse racing), the total amount of money paid out to the owners of horses racing at a particular track over a given period
- Prize money, "purse", or "purse money", a monetary reward paid out to the crew of a ship for capturing an enemy vessel
- Purse bid, in boxing the aggregate prize money
- Purse (surname), a surname
- Purse State Park, a state park in Charles County, Maryland
- Privy Purse, money in the past British monarchy raised from the income of the Crown Estate lands and holdings
- La Bourse ("purse" in French), a short story by French novelist Honoré de Balzac
- Purse (EP), a 2019 EP by Elvis Costello and the Imposters

== See also ==
- Purser (disambiguation)
- Parse, in computing and linguistics
- Peirce (disambiguation)
- Perse (disambiguation)
- Percy (disambiguation)
- Purce
