= Isert Kelly Castle =

Tower house in County Galway, Ireland

- Caisleán Íseart Uí Cheallaigh (Irish)
- Isserkelly Castle
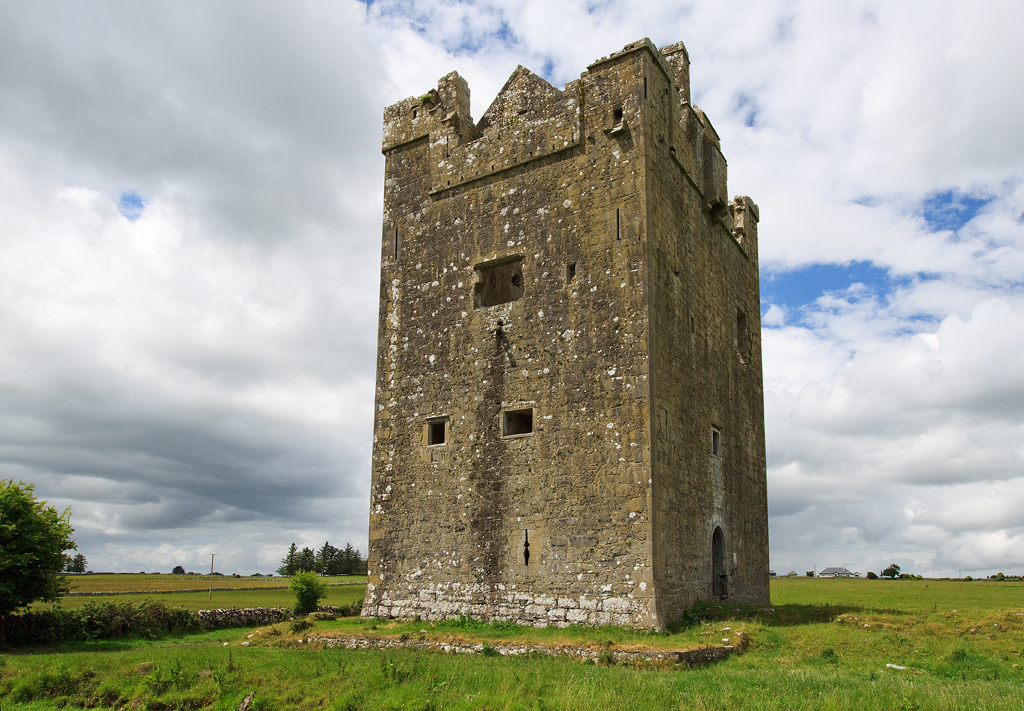

- Location within Ireland
- 53.157982°N 8.718990°W
- Type: tower house
- Location: Castlepark, Kilchreest, County Galway, Ireland

History
- Built: 15th century

Site notes
- Height: 21 m (69 ft)
- Owner: State

National monument of Ireland
- Official name: Isert Kelly Castle
- Reference no.: 272

Isert Kelly Castle is a tower house and National Monument located in County Galway, Ireland.

== Location ==
Isert Kelly Castle is 5 km (3.1 mi) southwest of Kilchreest.

== History ==
The tower house was built some time in the 15th century. It belonged to the MacHubert Burkes, who claim descent from Hubert, son of Richard Óg de Burgh, a Hiberno-Norman knight of the 13th century. It later passed to the MacRedmonds, another branch of the Burkes (de Burgo, de Búrca).

It was burned by the Ó Doṁnaill (O'Donnells) in 1596. A fireplace within is dated 1604.

After the Cromwellian conquest of Ireland Isert Kelly Castle passed to Dudley Persse. William Persse owned it in the 19th century.

Substantial excavation took place in 2014–16.

== Description ==
The tower house is well-preserved and stands 21 m (69 ft) tall, within a bawn 60 m (200 ft) square. Secondary buildings may have included a hall, stables, cottages and barns. The surrounding "Castlepark" townland covers 20.5 ha (51 acres).

The first floor is vaulted and has a fireplace. The second floor has arcades. The main room is at the third storey with a dated fireplace of 1604 with the initials W.H.
