= Bahamut =

Mythical sea monster

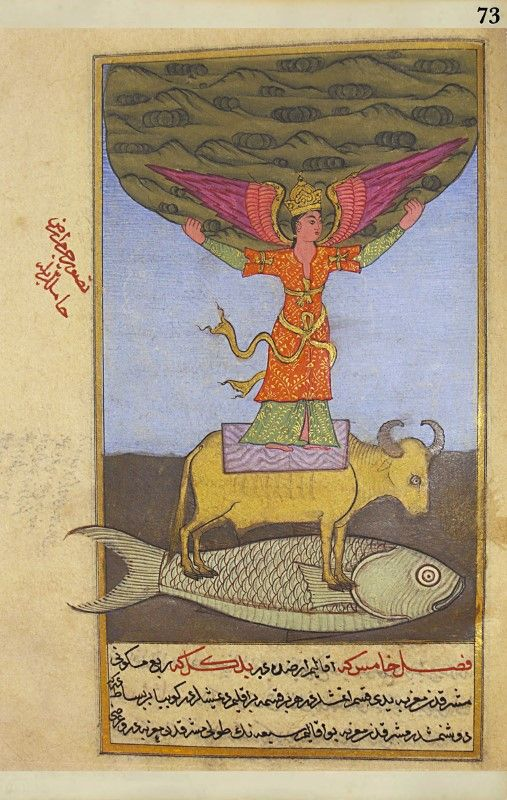
The fish (Bahamut) carries on its back the giant bull (Kuyuta), and on the green hyacinth slab stands an earth-bearing angel. —Surüri's Turkish translation of al-Qazwini. Topkapi Palace Museum, Istanbul, MSSA A 3632, folio 131a

Bahamut, or Bahamoot (/bəˈhɑːmuːt/ bə-HAH-moot; Arabic: بهموت), according to Zakariya al-Qazwini, is a monster that lies deep below, underpinning the support structure that holds up the earth.

In this conception of the world, the earth is shouldered by an angel, who stands on a slab of gemstone, which is supported by the cosmic beast (ox) sometimes called Kuyutha'(/Kuyuthan)/Kiyuban/Kibuthan (plausibly a corruption or misrendering of Hebrew לִוְיָתָן "Leviathan"). Bahamut carries this bull on its back, and is suspended in water for its own stability.

Balhūt is a variant name found in some cosmographies. In the earliest sources, the name is Lutīyā, with Balhūt given as a byname and Bahamūt as a nickname.

== Orthography ==
Bahamūt is the spelling given in al-Qazwini's (d. 1283) cosmography. (Note: The Wonders of Creation) Bahamoot is Edward Lane's transcribed spelling. Balhūt is the alternate spelling given in Yaqut al-Hamawi's (d. 1229) geographic work (Note: Mu'jam al-Buldan) and copies of Ibn al-Wardi's (d. 1457) work. (Note: Ibn al-Wardi (d. 1457), The Pearl of Wonders (Kharīdat al-ʿajā'ib wa-farīdat al-ghāraʾib). "Belhut" in a Latin translation.)

The name is thought to derive from the biblical Behemoth (Hebrew: בְּהֵמוֹת; cf. Job 40:15-24), and it was thus rendered in German as Behemot by Ethé. (Note: Ferdinand Wüstenfeld's edited text and Hermann Ethé's incomplete translation.) However, the original biblical Behemoth never appeared as a fish. A reshaping of its nature must have occurred in Arab storytelling, some time in the pre-Islamic period. One proposed scenario is that a pair of beasts from the Bible were confused with each other: the behemoth mis-assigned to the fish, and the aquatic leviathan to the bull.

== Lane's summary ==
Bahamut, according to Lane's abstract of a particular Islamic work on cosmography, is a giant fish acting as one of the layers that supports the earth. It is so immense "[all] the seas of the world, placed in one of the fish's nostrils, would be like a mustard seed laid in the desert". Above the fish stands a bull called Kuyootà, on the bull, a "ruby" (Note: Arabic yāqūt is ambiguous, and it had been endered "ruby" as Lane and Perron but also "green emerald" elsewhere; or "rock", or "green jacinth", "green corundum", or "green rock".) rock, on the rock an angel to shoulder the earth. Below the Bahamut (Leviathan) is the colossus serpentine Falak.

Lane's primary Islamic source for his summary is unclear, as Lane merely refers to it circumlocutiously as "the work of one of the writers above quoted". (Note: The source he notes at the end of the summary is al-Damiri ("Ed-Demeeree"), but this source does not completely match Lane's summary in details, at least when using Perron's translation of al-Damiri for comparison.)

== Arabic sources ==
There are a number of Islamic cosmographical treatises, of more or less similar content.

There can occur certain discrepancies in Western translations, even when there are no textual differences in the Arabic. The creature, named Bahamut or Balhut in these sources, can be described as a fish or whale according to translation, since the original Arabic word hūt (حوت) can mean either. Also, the gem comprising the slab beneath the angel's feet, in Arabic yāqūt (ياقوت) is of ambiguous meaning, and can be rendered as "ruby", or variously otherwise.

=== Cosmography ===
==== Qazwini group ====
Al-Damiri (d. 1405) on authority of Wahb ibn Munabbih was one of Lane's sources, possibly the source of his main summary. (Note: At least this is the source ("Ed-Demeeree, on the authority of Wahb Ibn-Munebbih, quoted by El-Isḥáḳee, 1, 1.") which he cites at the apparent end of the description from one work; after which he begins "Another opinion is..." and moves to a different source.) His description of "Bahmût" (French translation) matches Lane's summary down to certain key details. (Note: The bull having 4,000 eyes, nose, ears, mouths, tongue, and legs.) However, there seems to be discrepancies in using "a heap of sand" (instead of "mustard") in the size analogy.

Al-Qazwini (d. 1283)'s (Note: Or "El-Ḳazweenee" as Lane spells his name. Lane cites him in the foregoing passages on "Kaf", Arabic Society, p. 105.) cosmography The Wonders of Creation on the contrary agrees with Lane on these points. (Note: On the "mustard seed" analogy and proximity of the bull's name: "mustard seed" (German "Senfkorn") in Ethé's translation. Bull's names are "Kīyūbān (Arabic: کیوبان) or Kibūthān" (Arabic: کبوثان) in Wüstenfeld's edition, but also written "Kuyūthā" (كيوثاء ) in some version.) However, it disagrees somewhat with Lane's description regarding what lies below the fish: water, air, then a region of darkness, and with respect to the bull's appendages. (Note: The bull has 40,000 eyes, etc.) (Note: Although these differences are strictly based on the edition of Qazwini published in Germany (Wüstenfeld ed.)) It should be cautioned that Qazwini's cosmography is known to exist in a variety of different manuscripts.

Both cosmographies provide the story as words spoken by Wahb ibn Munabbih, so the descriptions should be similar at the core. In fact, Al-Damiri's version is considered to be mere redactions of Qazwini printed onto its margins.

==== Yakut group ====
Ibn al-Wardi (d. 1457) (Kharīdat al-ʿAjā'ib, "The Pearl of Wonders") is another source used by Lane, to give variant readings. Its chapter that includes the cosmography has been deemed a copy of Yaqut al-Hamawi (d. 1229)'s Mu'jam al-Buldan, with similar wording, with some rearrangements, and very slight amounts of discrepant information.

"Balhūt" is the name of the great fish given in both Ibn al-Wardi and Yaqut. (Note: Although in some printed editions of Ibn al-Wardi, it occurs as "bahmūt" (equivalent to "Bahamūt").) (Note: Jwaideh (1987), p. 34, note 4, where it states that in Ibn al-Wardi, Kharīdat, p. 14 the spelling is given as "bahmūt". The Kharīdat here is that of the Cairo edition of AH1324/AD1906.)

Yakut and al-Wardi both say there is a layer of sandhill between the bull and the fish. They also describe what lies under the fish somewhat differently.

These texts connect the cosmic fish and bull with phenomena of nature, namely the waxing and ebbing of tides, maintenance of the sea-level, and earthquakes. The account which only connects concerns the bull states that its breathing causes the waxing and ebbing of the tides. (Note: Yaqut, ibn-Wardi, and al-Tha'labi.) And since the fish and the bull drink the water running off the earth into the sea, they counteract the tap-off causing sea-level to rise. But the beasts will eventually become engorged, when they will become agitated, or, it marks the advent of Judgment Day (Ibn al-Wardi, Yaqut).

=== Lives of prophets ===
There are two Qiṣaṣ al-anbīyāʾ ("Lives of the Prophets"), one by al-Tha'labi, known otherwise for his Tafsir al-Thalabi, the other by Muḥammad al-Kisāʾī which are considered the oldest authorities containing similar cosmographical descriptions concerning the big fish and bull. In al-Tha'labi's text is an elucidation on the whale having several names, as follows: "God created a large fish (nūn) which is a huge whale whose name (ism) is Lutīyā, by-name (kunyah) Balhūt, and nickname (laqab) Bahamūt".

=== Tafsir ===
There are also commentaries on the cosmic beasts in the body of literature called the Tafsir, or "Exegesis of the Quran".

In his tafsir, Ibn Abbas (d. 687) explains the presence of the mysterious letter (Muqattaʿat) nun (نٓ) at the beginning of sūrah 68 "Al-Qalam", with the following:

"...Allah swears by the Nun, which is the whale that carries the earths on its back while in Water,
and beneath which is the Bull and under the Bull is the Rock and under the Rock is the Dust and none knows what is under the Dust save Allah.
The name of the whale is Liwash, and it is said its name is Lutiaya' ;
the name of the bull is Bahamut, and some say its name is Talhut or Liyona.
The whale is in a sea called 'Adwad, and it is like a small bull in a huge sea.
The sea is in a hollowed rock whereby there is 4,000 cracks, and from each crack water springs out to the earth. ..."

Here Bahamut refers to the bull, not the whale. Talhut seems to be an alternative writing of Balhut, while Liwash and Lutiaya' would stem from "Leviathan".

In Kashf al-Asrar, the tafsir of the same sūrah mentions that the shape of the nun letter (نٓ) resembled the fish on the water below the seven layers of the earth, bent by the heavy burden of the earth placed on its back.

"Some of the commentators have said that Nūn is a fish on the water below the seven layers of the earth.
Because of the burden of the earth is so heavy, the fish became bent.
It became like the nūn [ن], its head lifted up from the east and its tail from the west"

The meaning of nun in Al-Qalam has many interpretations.

== Earthquakes ==
Yakut also gives the account that Iblis almost incited the whale Balhūt into causing a quake, but God distracted it by sending gnats to its eyes. Or alternatively, God had sent a sword-like fish that bedazzled and captivated the giant fish. This account is also found in al-Tha'labi's Qiṣaṣ al-anbīyāʾ, but in that version God forces the whale (Lutīyā) into submission by sending a creature that invaded through its nose and reached its brain; it also claims to be an anecdote on authority of Kaʿb al-Aḥbār (d. 650s A.D.), a convert considered the earliest informant of Jewish-Muslim tradition to Arab writers. (Note: The account is also given by Ibn al-Wardi, by al-Suyūṭī (d. 1505) and the al-Jazzār (d. after 1576).)

Although this is an instance of an Arabic tale that ascribes the origins of earthquakes to the cosmic whale/fish supporting the earth, more familiar beliefs in medieval Arab associate the earthquake with the bull, or with Mount Qaf.

Jorge Luis Borges has drawn parallels between Bahamut and the mythical Japanese fish "Jinshin-Uwo", although the correct term would be jishin uo (地震魚; lit. 'earthquake fish'); cf. Namazu-e or 'catfish pictures'.

Japanese folklorist Taryō Ōbayashi has explained that the traditional belief in the earthquake-causing bull is heavily concentrated in Arab regions (Saharan Africa, Arabian Peninsula, Pakistan, Malay), whereas the motif of "World-Fish's movement causes earthquake" is found mostly in parts of Indochina, China, and throughout Japan.

== Borges ==
According to Jorge Luis Borges's work, the Book of Imaginary Beings (1957), Bahamut is "altered and magnified" from Behemoth and described as so immense that a human cannot bear its sight.

Borges placed Bahamut as the identity of the unnamed giant fish which Isa (Jesus) witnessed in the story of the 496th night of One Thousand and One Nights (Burton's edition). (Note: This is one of the tales in "The Adventures of Bulukiya".) This giant fish supports a bull, the bull a rock, and the rock an angel, exactly as in the traditional Perso-Arabic medieval model of the world. (Note: Burton hinted this also, footnoting that this bull was the cosmic "Bull of the Earth", and gives appelation in Persian as gāw-i zamīn.) (Note: Except the night's tale adds that in the further depths lives a serpent called Falak.) Borges appropriated the description of the Bahamut from Edward Lane's Arabian Society in the Middle Ages. (Note: And not, as one might be led to believe, from Lane's translation of the Arabian Nights. In fact, Lane after Chapter 19 (Nights 424–436) skips to Night 537, so he omits this Bulukiya tale entirely.)

== In popular culture ==
- In the Dungeons & Dragons tabletop role-playing game, Bahamut is the dragon god of justice, and is the first instance of the name being used for a dragon.
- In the Rage of Bahamut collectible card game and its anime adaptation, Bahamut is an ancient dragon with the capability to destroy the world. In the anime, preventing or aiding Bahamut's release is the goal of most of the story's factions. This Bahamut later appears in Granblue Fantasy and Dragalia Lost.
- In the Undefeated Bahamut Chronicle light novel series, manga and anime adaptations, Bahamut is a divine drag-ride wielded by the main character Lux Arcadia with the ability to warp reality by compression and strengthening local laws of reality using its divine raiment Reload on Fire.
- In the Final Fantasy video game series, Bahamut is one of the most prominent summons – monsters that can be brought into battle to fight for their summoner. It appears in almost all installments of the series, with the exception of Final Fantasy II and Final Fantasy XII, where its name is used for the game's final dungeon, Sky Fortress Bahamut.
- The album Bahamut by New York–based musical group Hazmat Modine features a song called "Bahamut" as its third track.
- Boa Alcazaba from the anime series "Beyblade Burst Evolution" have used a Bahamut Bey named Arc Balkesh, a defense type. It is most often depicted as a black and purple dragon with accents of teal and red.
- Bahamut is one of the nine guardians in La-Mulana. Here it is depicted as a large fish-like monster with the head of a hippo and a pair of wings on its back,
- In author Brandon Mull's YA fantasy novel Fablehaven, the demon Bahamut is imprisoned on the preserve, and freed by the witch Muriel Taggert during the events of book one.
- In Assassin's Creed Mirage, “Al-Bahamut” is the cryptonym adopted by Qabiha, a member of the Persian branch of the Order of the Ancients based in the Abbasid Caliphate.

== See also ==
- Atlas (mythology), a rough analogue from Greek mythology
- Bahamut, a dragon god from Dungeons & Dragons
- Dandan, another large fish in Arabian mythology
- Falak
- Gaokerena the mythical white haoma tree being guarded by analogue mythical creatures
- Makara or Kar Mahi, analogues from the Indo-Iranian cultural sphere
- World Turtle, a turtle thought to support the world in various mythologies
- Leviathan
