= World Turtle =

Giant turtle supporting or containing the world

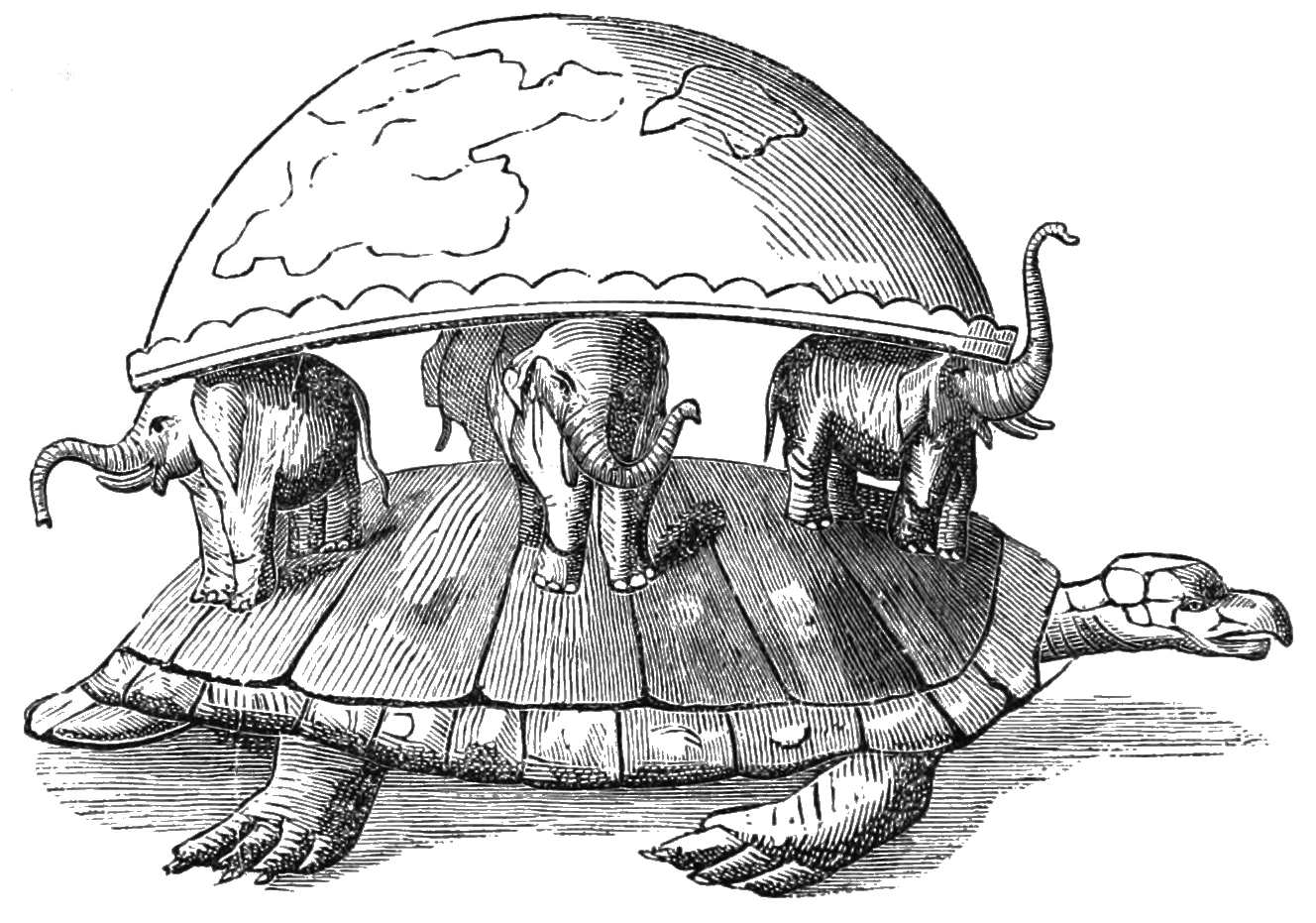
An 1877 drawing of the world supported on the backs of four elephants, themselves resting on the back of a turtle.

The World Turtle, also called the Cosmic Turtle or the World-Bearing Turtle, is a mytheme of a giant turtle (or tortoise) supporting or containing the world. It occurs in Hinduism, Chinese mythology, and the mythologies of some of the indigenous peoples of the Americas. The comparative mythology of the World-Tortoise discussed by Edward Burnett Tylor (1878: 341) includes the counterpart World Elephant.

== India ==
The World Turtle in Hinduism is known as Akūpāra (Sanskrit: अकूपार), or sometimes Chukwa. An example of a reference to the World Turtle in Hindu literature is found in Jñānarāja (the author of Siddhantasundara, writing c. 1500): "A vulture, whichever has only little strength, rests in the sky holding a snake in its beak for a prahara [three hours]. Why can [the deity] in the form of a tortoise, who possesses an inconceivable potency, not hold the Earth in the sky for a kalpa [billions of years]?" The British philosopher John Locke made reference to this in his 1689 tract, An Essay Concerning Human Understanding, which compares one who would say that properties inhere in "substance" to the Indian, who said the world was on an elephant, which was on a tortoise, "but being again pressed to know what gave support to the broad-backed tortoise, replied—something, he knew not what".

Brewer's Dictionary of Phrase and Fable lists, without citation, Maha-pudma and Chukwa as names from a "popular rendition of a Hindu myth in which the tortoise Chukwa supports the elephant Maha-pudma, which in turn supports the world".

== China ==
In the Chinese mythology, the creator goddess Nüwa cut the legs off the giant sea turtle Ao (simplified Chinese: 鳌; traditional Chinese: 鰲; pinyin: áo) and used them to prop up the sky after Gong Gong damaged Mount Buzhou, which had previously supported the heavens.

== North America ==
The Lenape creation story of the "Great Turtle" was first recorded between 1678 and 1680 by Jasper Danckaerts. The belief is shared by other indigenous peoples of the Northeastern Woodlands, most notably those of the Haudenosaunee confederacy, and the Anishinaabeg.

The Jesuit Relations contain a Huron story concerning the World Turtle:

"When the Father was explaining to them [some Huron seminarists] some circumstance of the passion of our Lord, and speaking to them of the eclipse of the Sun, and of the trembling of the earth which was felt at that time, they replied that there was talk in their own country of a great earthquake which had happened in former times; but they did not know either the time or the cause of that disturbance. 'There is still talk,' (said they) 'of a very remarkable darkening of the Sun, which was supposed to have happened because the great turtle which upholds the earth, in changing its position or place, brought its shell before the Sun, and thus deprived the world of sight.'"

== Southern Africa ==
The usilosimapundu of Zulu folklore also bears some similarities to the world turtle. It is a creature so large that it contains many countries and that one side of it experiences a different season than the other side.

== In modern media ==
The Discworld book series, created by Terry Pratchett, takes place on a fictional world that is a flat disc sitting on top of four elephants astride the shell of a giant turtle named Great A'Tuin.

In the 1938 Russian novel 'Старик Хоттабыч' The Old Genie Hottabych By Russian Jewish author Lazar Lagin, while Volka was presenting the teaching project of India in his classroom presentation, the anicent genie Hottabych, mind controls the mouth of Volka by making excuses about India being the richest country in the world, and even mentioning about the world turtle in it.

In the book Monday Begins on Saturday by Arkady and Boris Strugatsky, a disc upon elephants on a turtle is said to have been discovered by a pupil who entered an ideal world of imagination.

In the book It by Stephen King, Pennywise's archenemy is a giant turtle named Maturin. Maturin also appears in King's Wizard and Glass, the fourth book in The Dark Tower series.

In the start of the first chapter of the book A Brief History of Time by Stephen Hawking, an old woman says, "What you have told us is rubbish. The world is really a flat plate supported on the back of a giant tortoise."

The film Strange World is revealed to take place on and inside a World Turtle, with the characters trying to stop an infection from killing it.

According to the series creators of the television series Avatar: The Last Airbender, the lion turtle that guides Aang in the third season was heavily inspired by World Turtle myths.

In the Pokémon Scarlet and Violet videogame expansion, The Indigo Disk, the legendary Pokémon Terapagos can undergo Terastallization bearing the Stellar Type. In this form, Terapagos resembles the world as the ancients saw it.

In the video games Pokémon Diamond, Pokémon Pearl and Pokémon Platinum, the starter Pokémon Turtwig's Final Evolution Torterra was partially inspired by the World Turtle.

In Urusei Yatsura 2: Beautiful Dreamer, a giant turtle is carrying the world which is in some sort of time knot.

In the book A Wild Sheep Chase by Haruki Murakami, the narrator references this idea: "The world always makes me think of a tortoise and elephants tirelessly supporting a gigantic disc."

The television series What We Do in the Shadows references character Nandor the Relentless's belief in the World Turtle in the episode "The Casino". A B-plot of the episode involves character Colin Robinson teaching Nandor about the Big Bang Theory.

The young adult novel Turtles All the Way Down and subsequent film adaptation derives its name from the World Turtle and discusses it.

The television series It's Always Sunny in Philadelphia references this idea in the episode "Charlie Rules the World", as Frank Reynolds, arguing with Dennis Reynolds about what is real, claims that they could be in "a turtle's dream in outer space".

Sturgill Simpson's song "Turtles All the Way Down" is a modern country psychedelic ballad from his 2014 album Metamodern Sounds in Country Music. Sturgill comes to a conclusion, choosing to encourage listeners to live their life the way they please, and don’t waste their time trying to find the answers, because "it's turtles all the way down the line".

In the video game Metal Gear Solid 2: Sons of Liberty, an illustration of a World Turtle appears if the game is paused during the Arsenal Gear section.

In the manga and television series Naruto, the turtle Genbu, also referred to as the Island Turtle, carries an island-sized ecosystem on its back.

The 2009 Every Time I Die song "Turtles All The Way Down" directly references the World Turtle with the lyrics "Here I go again, I'm chasing my tail around the sun, standing beneath a tortoise, under an elephant, under the world".

== In philosophy ==
The infinite regress in epistemology and its generalisation in philosophy often use the expression "turtles all the way down" to indicate an explanatory failure based on an explanation that needs a potentially infinite series of additional explanations to support it.

== See also ==
- Aspidochelone
- Atlas
- Bahamut
- Behemoth
- Discworld
- Kujata
- Mytheme
- Turtle Island
- Turtles all the way down
- World Serpent
- World Tree
- Zaratan
