= Kujata =

Cosmic bull in medieval Islam

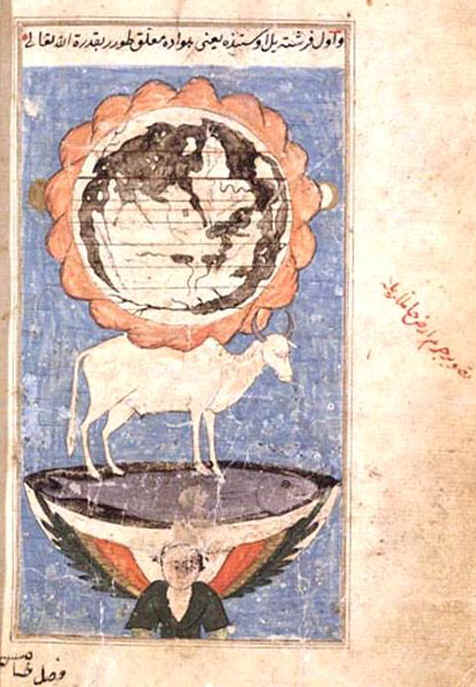
The cosmic bull Kuyūthāʾ bears the Flat Earth, which is rimmed by Mount Qaf and stands on Bahamut. Ottoman Turkish version of The Wonders of Creation by Zakariya al-Qazwini, c.1553.

Kuyūthāʾ (Arabic: كيوثاء), more rarely Kiyūbān (کیوبان) or Kibūthān (کبوثان), is the cosmic bull in medieval Muslim cosmography. It is said to carry on its back the angel who shoulders the world, and the rock platform upon which this angel stands. The Kuyūthāʾ is said to stand on the back of Bahamut, a giant fish or whale.

The bull is variously described as having 40,000 horns and legs, or 40,000 eyes, ears, mouths, and tongues, in the oldest Islamic sources. The number of appendages can vary in later versions. Its breathing controls the tides.

The Kiyūbān or Kibūthān appear in printed editions of Zakariya al-Qazwini's cosmography. These have been claimed to be corruptions of the term Leviathan (Hebrew Old Testament).(Arabic: لوياتان) Alternate names include al-Rayann.

Edward William Lane transcribed the name as Kuyootà or Kuyoothán, and in various editions of Jorge Luis Borges' Book of Imaginary Beings, it is given as Kuyata (Spanish), Kujata (first English translation, 1969), and Quyata (revised English translation).

== Orthography ==
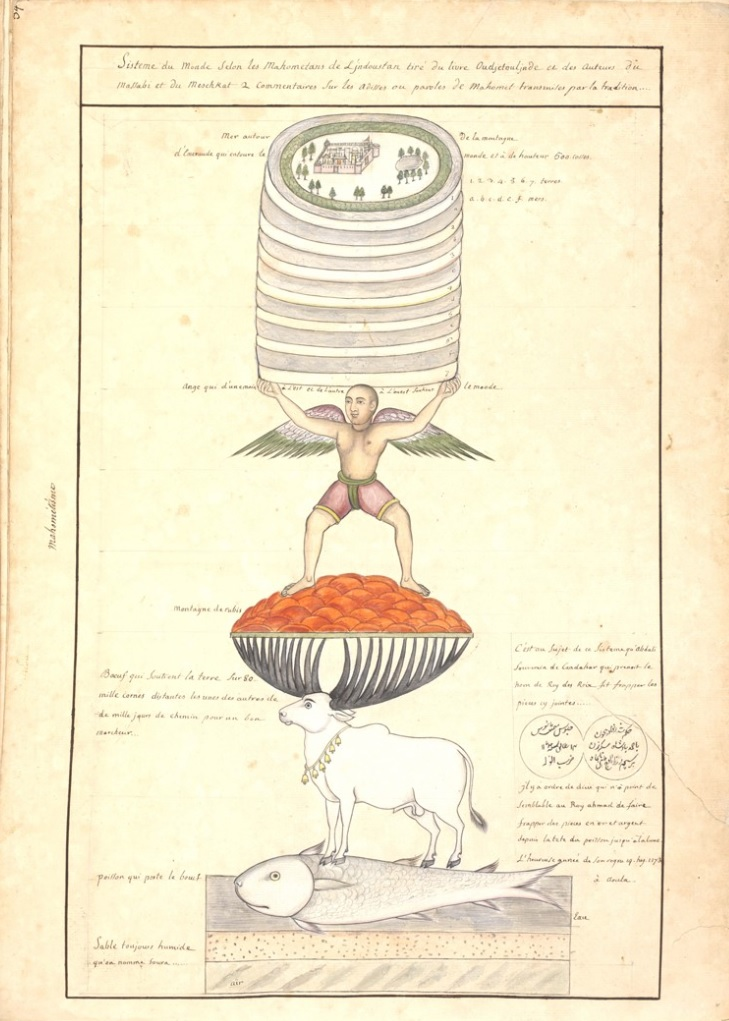
The angel-supporting ruby mountain ("montagne de rubis") balanced on the multi-horned bull. Islamic cosmography. (Note: The top disc is one of 7 earths, within a ring of emerald mountains, surrounded by sea ("mer autour de la montagne d'emeraude"). Copied from the book Oudjetoulinde. Text commentaries of Massabi and Meschat.) —Gentil Album (1774), p. 34. Held by the Victoria and Albert Museum.

"Kuyootà" was Edward Lane's transcription of the beast's name according to an Arabic source not clearly specified. (Note: Lane introduces the source as an "account as inserted in the work of one of the writers above quoted".) This became "Kuyata" in Jorge Luis Borges's El libro de los seres imaginarios (originally published as Manual de zoología fantástica, 1957). Then in its first English translation Book of Imaginary Beings (1969) it was further changed to "Kujata", (Note: di Giovanni's English translation Book of Imaginary Beings, 1969.) and then to "Quyata" (in the 2005 translation). (Note: Hurley's English translation Book of Imaginary Beings, 2005)

Kuyūta is yet another spelling in print, re-transcribed from Lane. Kujūta was given by Thomas Patrick Hughes's Dictionary of Islam.

"Kuyūthā" appears in a copy of al-Qazwini's cosmography (Note: "الصخرة أن تدخل تحت قدمي الملك ثم لم يكن للصخرة قرار فخلق الله تعالى ثورا عظيما يقال له كيوثاء (..the rock to under the feet of the malak (angel), and as the rock was not steady, God created a great bull called Kuyūthā)") and as "Kīyūbān (Arabic: کیوبان) or Kibūthān" (Arabic: کبوثان) in Wüstenfeld's 1859 printed edition of al-Qazwini. These names are said to be corrupted text, and emended to read close to "Leviat[h]an", by German translator Hermann Ethé. (Note: Wüstenfeld's edition has been criticized for being a collation (composite), mostly based on the Codex Gotha 1508, portions replaced with text from other manuscripts; for being thus based on a late 18th century copy; and not using a shorter recension that was the most widely disseminated.)

"Kuyoothán" is an alternate spelling from the source Lane identifies as Ibn-Esh-Shiḥneh, which was a manuscript Lane had in his possession.

Rakaboûnâ is one variant name for the bull, as read from some manuscript of Al-Damiri (d. 1405) by French Dr. Nicolas Perron, though the original text has al-thawr Kuyūtha (Arabic: الثور كيوثا, 'the bull Kuyūtha'. Cairo ed. of 1819) Al-Rayann is the name of the bull as it appears in Muḥammad al-Kisāʾī (ca. 1100)'s version of the Qiṣaṣ al-Anbiyā’ ("Tales of the Prophets"). A reshaping of its nature must have occurred in Arab storytelling, some time in the pre-Islamic period. One proposed scenario is that a pair of beasts from the Old Testament were confused with each other; the behemoth mis-assigned to the fish, and the aquatic leviathan to the bull.

Shia sources like the 17th-century hadith collection Biḥār al-anwār have the variant Lahūtā.

Some scholars have shown how the variations of this name may come down to subtle changes in the script and misreadings over the centuries, especially when moving from manuscript to print. In terms of palaeography, the ductus similarities of the consonants involved would explain the shifts between luyā-, luhā- and kujā-.

== Derivation ==
Lūyātān (Arabic: لوياتان) was the bull's reconstructed correct name in Arabic according Hermann Ethé's notes. Accordingly, he translates the bull's name as Leviathan in his German translation of Qazwini. (Note: Just as he translates the great fish's name, Bahamūt as Behemot (German for Behemoth).)

Other commentators such as Maximillan Streck have also stated that the bull derived from the biblical (Old Testament) Leviathan, much as the name of the Islamic cosmic fish Bahamut derived from the biblical(Old Testament) Behemoth.

== Lane's summary ==
Borges relied on Islamic traditional cosmography as summarized by Edward Lane in Arabian Society in the Middle Ages (1883).

Lane's summary of Arabic source explains that "Kuyootà" was the name of the bull created by God to hold up a rock of "ruby", on which stood an earth-propping angel. God created the angel, rock, then the bull in that order according to this source, (Note: Angel, then bull, then rock on the bull's hump, according to Ibn al-Wardi, Yaqut al-Hamawi, and al-Tha'labi.) then a giant fish called Bahamut to sustain the bull underneath. Before this, the earth was oscillating in wayward directions, and all these layers of support were needed to achieve stability.

The bull had 4,000 eyes, ears, noses, mouths, tongues, and feet, according to Lane's summary, but the number is 40,000 eyes, limbs, etc. in several (older) Islamic sources, as discussed below.

== Arabic sources ==
The earliest extant reference to a cosmic bull upon which the world sits on the horn of appears in the Tafsir of the anthropomorphist Muqatil ibn Sulayman, who died in 767 A.D, who reports this notion on the authority of Ibn Abbas. The earliest Shia source mentioning a cosmic bull meanwhile, appears to be the 10th century Kitab al-Kafi, which reports that Ja'far al-Sadiq said that the earth rests upon a whale, which rests upon water, which rests upon a rock, which rests upon the horns of a bull.

Kuyūthā (Note: "Kīyūbān/Kibūthān" is Wüstenfeld ed. published in the West, as noted.) is the name of the bull in the text of al-Qazwini (d. 1283)'s popular cosmography, The Wonders of Creation. This approximates Lane's spelling "Kuyootà". There exist a multitude of "editions" and manuscripts of al-Qazwini, which vary widely.

Al-Damiri (d. 1405) on authority of Wahb ibn Munabbih, is one source he specifically named as being used by Lane, in his summary. (Note: "Ed-Demeeree, on the authority of Wahb Ibn-Munebbih, quoted by El-Isḥáḳee, 1, 1.") This so-called al-Damiri's account is considered to be a mere later redaction of al-Qazwini's cosmography printed on the margins, and it may be noted that in Qazwini's account, Wahb ibn Munabbih acts as narrator. A translation of Al-Damiri into French was undertaken by Nicolas Perron. The bull's name was however "Rakaboûnâ" (Rakabūnā) in al-Damiri, according to Perron's translation.

The name of the bull is wanting in Yaqut al-Hamawi (d. 1229)'s geography, Mu'jam al-Buldan. Yaqut is thought to have borrowed from al-Tha'labi (d. 1038)’s Qiṣaṣ al-anbīyāʾ ("Lives of the Prophets"), one of the two earliest sources containing the cosmology.

Ibn al-Wardi (d. 1457) (Kharīdat al-ʿAjā'ib, "The Pearl of Wonders"), considered to be a derivative rearrangement of Yaqut, is an alternate source used by Lane who noted variant readings from it.

=== Number of appendages ===
The bull has 4,000 legs in al-Damiri (d. 1405). But in Qazwini (d. 1283), the bull has 40,000 eyes, etc., with "teeth" (German: zähnen) replacing "tongues" in Lane's list. The hyperbolically large numbers recur in older texts: "40,000 horns and 40,000 limbs" according to Yaqut (d. 1229)'s geography, 70,000 horns and 40,000 legs according to al-Tha'labi (d. 1038)’s Lives and 40,000 eyes, ears, mouths and tongues according to Muḥammad al-Kisāʾī's Lives of the Prophets.

The bull has 40 humps, 40 horns, and four feet according to Ibn al-Wardi (d. 1457) in another passage, (although in the corresponding passage he merely repeats Yaqut's 40,000 horns and feet).

Its horns extended from the earth to God's Throne (Arabic: عرش, ʿarš), entangling it or lying like a "prickly hedge" underneath.

=== Gem rock above bull ===
As for the rock platform supported by the bull, which Lane said was made of "ruby", the Arabic word used in original sources yāqūt (ياقوت) has ambiguous meaning. Many of the Islamic sources have specifically indicated the rock was a green gem, viz.: "rock (made) of green jacinth", "green rock", "green corundum", etc. It is given as "green emerald" in a Latin translation of ibn al-Wardi.

Allah created the angel, rock, then bull in that order (the order they are arranged, one on top of another), according to Qazwini. However, in other sources, Allah created in the order of angel then bull, so that the angel could stand on the bull's hump, but as this was unstable, Allah inserted the rock platform above the bull's hump. (Note: Also Ibn al-Wardi.) These sources also say that Allah also inserted a sandhill between the great bull and the great fish. (Note: Also Ibn al-Wardi.)

=== Bull controlling tides ===
The bull's breathing is said to control the ocean tides according to some sources. Among the oldest sources (al-Tha'labi), the bull (ox) had its nose in the sea, and breathed once a day, (Note: Yaqut says it "breathed two breaths" each day, but this can be read as one breath out and one breath in.) causing the sea to rise when it exhaled, and ebb when it inhaled. The bull had its two nostrils pinned against two holes in the "green corundum" enabling it to breathe (Yaqut). (Note: Ibn al-Wardi also referred to this. The bull breathed through ducts (foramina) in the "green emerald".)

On a related natural phenomenon, the bull and fish were considered responsible for drinking the water that tapped off from the land into the sea, maintaining the base level of the ocean's water. However, once their bellies become full they will become agitated (Ibn al-Wardi), and it is a sign of the advent of Judgment Day (Yaqut).

== See also ==
- Leviathan
- Behemoth
- Gavaevodata
- Atlas (mythology)
- Tur (Bosnian-Slavic mythology)
- Turtles all the way down
