= Purie =

Purie is a surname. Notable people with the surname include:

- Aroon Purie (born 1944), Indian businessman, publisher, and editor-in-chief
- Koel Purie (born 1978), Indian film actress, producer, and television presenter

== See also ==
- Purce
- Purje
- Urie (name)
