= Law Reform Committee =

The Law Reform Committee was a committee in England and Wales appointed by the Lord Chancellor "to consider, having regard especially to judicial decisions, what changes are desirable in such legal doctrines as the Lord Chancellor may from time to time refer to Committee".

The Lord Chancellor's decision to create this committee was announced on 2 May 1952 by the Attorney General, Lionel Heald, at the dinner of the West Surrey Law Society. The Solicitors Journal said that the proposed step was "overdue". The Committee was appointed on 16 June 1952. In 2006, John Wheeler said that the Committee was "defunct".

== Composition ==
Six members of the Committee were judges, two were Queen's Counsel, two were solicitors and the remaining three were professors of law.

== Reports ==
Law Reform Committee reports
Report	Subject	Command paper	Date	Implementing act
1st	Statute of Frauds and Section 4 of the Sale of Goods Act 1893	Cmd. 8809	1953	Law Reform (Enforcement of Contracts) Act 1954
2nd	Innkeepers' liability for property of travellers, guests and residents	Cmd. 916	May 1954	Hotel Proprietors Act 1956
3rd	Occupiers' liability to invitees, licensees and trespassers	Cmd. 9305	November 1954	Occupiers' Liability Act 1957
4th	Rule against perpetuities	Cmnd. 18	1956	Perpetuities and Accumulations Act 1964
5th	Conditions and exceptions in insurance policies	Cmnd. 62	1957	
6th	Courts' power to sanction variations of trusts	Cmnd. 310	1957	
7th	Effect of tax liability on damages	Cmnd. 501	August 1958	
8th	Formalities of contracts by non-trading corporations	Cmnd. 622	1958	
9th	Liability in tort between husband and wife	Cmnd. 1268	January 1961	
10th	Innocent misrepresentation	Cmnd. 1782	1962	Misrepresentation Act 1967
11th	Loss of services	Cmnd. 2017	1963	Section 2 of the Administration of Justice Act 1982
12th	Transfer of title to chattels	Cmnd. 2958	April 1966	Not implemented by 2006
13th	Hearsay evidence in civil proceedings	Cmnd. 2964	May 1966	
14th	Acquisition of easements and profits by prescription	Cmnd. 3100	October 1966	
15th	The Rule in Hollington v. Hewthorn	Cmnd. 3391	September 1967	
16th	Privilege in civil proceedings	Cmnd. 3472	December 1967	
17th	Evidence of opinion and expert evidence	Cmnd. 4489	October 1970	
18th	Conversion and detinue	Cmnd. 4774	September 1971	Torts (Interference with Goods) Act 1977 (partial and modified effect).
19th	Interpretation of wills	Cmnd. 5301	May 1973	sections 20 and 21 of the Administration of Justice Act 1982
20th	Interim report on limitation of actions: In personal injury claims	Cmnd. 5630	May 1974	
21st	Final report on limitation of actions	Cmnd. 6923	September 1977	Limitation Amendment Act 1980.
22nd	The making and revocation of wills	Cmnd. 7902	May 1980	section 17 of the Administration of Justice Act 1982
23rd	The powers and duties of trustees	Cmnd. 8733	October 1982	
24th	Latent damage	Cmnd. 9390	November 1984	Latent Damage Act 1986

== See also ==
- Law commission
- Law Commissions Act 1965
