= Tur (Bosnian-Slavic mythology) =

Tur is a Slavic mythical creature that originated in central Bosnia and Herzegovina. According to tales, Tur is a giant bull that holds the Earth on its back, akin to Kujata, the ox that helps in holding the world in Islamic mythology, or the World Elephant. Whenever he moves his horns, an earthquake happens. Should Tur one day move his whole body, this would cause the end of the world.

== Description ==
He is described as a giant black bull with curved, pointy horns.

== See also ==
- Gugalanna
- Kujata (mythology)
