= Persa =

Persa may refer to:

- Persa (play), a comedy by the Roman playwright Plautus
- Perse (mythology) (also Persa or Perseis), an Oceanid and consort of Helios in Greek mythology
- Dan Persa, (born 1988) American college football player

== See also ==
- Perse (disambiguation)
