= Mount Qaf =

Legendary mountain

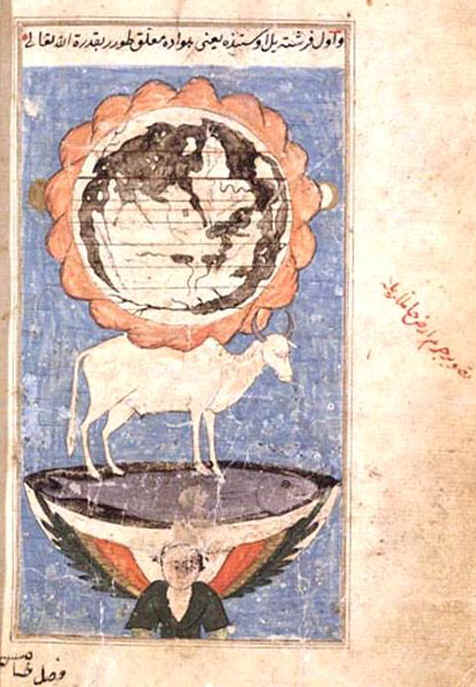
A cosmological illustration in The Wonders of Creation by Zakariya al-Qazwini showing "Earth with the surrounding range of Qaf Mountains resting on the back of a giant bull (al-Rayyan), which in turn stands on a vast fish (Bahamut) held up by an Angel." This type of visualisation of the structure of the world was not unusual in the thirteenth century.

Mount Qaf, or Qaf-Kuh, also spelled Cafcuh and Kafkuh (Persian: قاف‌کوه), or Jabal Qaf, also spelled Djebel Qaf (Arabic: جبل قاف); Koh-i-Qaf, also spelled Koh-Qaf and Kuh-i-Qaf or Kuh-e Qaf (Persian: کوہ قاف); or Kaf Dağı in Turkish, and Kee--wi-Qaf in (Sorani Kurdish: کێوی قاف), is a legendary mountain in the popular mythology of the Middle East. In some early Arab traditions, Mount Qaf is said to be the homeland of the jinn and was made out of shining emerald by God.

== Iranian tradition ==
In Iranian tradition this mountain could be any of the following:

- The highest mountain in Qafqaz
- The "unknown" mountain referred to as Gapkuh (Note: Qāf is the Arabized form of the Middle Persian word gâp meaning "unknown". The oldest mention of Gapkuh or the "unknown mountain" is in an inscription of Shapur I (241-272 AD) for the mountains between the Black Sea and the Caspian Sea. The name of the Caucasus Mountains is said to have ultimately come from Kapkof or Kafkaz, corrupted variant(s) of Gapkuh.)
- The land of the Daeva (who did not follow Zoroastrianism)
- Saoshyant's battlefield
- Simurgh's nest

The Pari and Deev kingdoms of Qaf include Shad-u-kam (Pleasure and Delight), with its capital Juherabad (Jewel-city), Amberabad (Amber-city), and Ahermanabad (Aherman’s city).

== Arabic tradition ==
Mount Qaf in Arabic tradition is a mysterious mountain renowned as the furthest point of the earth owing to its location at the far side of the ocean encircling the earth. Because of its remoteness, the North Pole is sometimes identified with this mountain. According to Hatim Tai’s account, the Qaf Mountains were said to be composed of green emerald, peridot or chrysolite, whose reflection gave a greenish tint to the sky. It is regarded as the home of the Jinn race and the place beyond which the unseen divine world begins. In Arabic literature, Qaf was the loftiest of the mountain ranges created by God to support the earth and was the parent of all other earthly mountains, to which it was linked by subterranean ranges. The range is separated from the world of men by the oceans that surround the known world. Qaf, as the primeval mountain, came to symbolise the cosmic mountain where the natural and supernatural met and the link between the terrestrial and celestial worlds was established. It is said that the anqa and rukh will come here. The emerald-made cities Jabulqa and Jabulsa, situated in darkness, are said to be contiguous to the mountain Qaf.

According to Al-Qurtubi Dhul-Qarnayn went to this mountain, and when he asked it "O Qaf, tell me something of the greatness of Allah." It replied, "Indeed, the affair of our Lord is mighty; behind me is a land five hundred years' journey by five hundred years' journey, consisting of mountains of snow smashing against one another—were it not for them, I would have burned from the heat of Hellfire." Upon hearing this, Dhul-Qarnayn said, "Tell me more." It said, "Jibril stands before Allah while his shoulder blades/muscles tremble, and from every tremor Allah creates one hundred thousand angels. Those angels stand before Allah Almighty with their heads bowed, and when Allah permits them to speak, they say: 'There is no god worthy of worship except Allah.' Ibn Kathir however regarded Qaf as a Jewish fable.

Zakariya al-Qazwini published ʿAjā'ib al-makhlūqāt wa gharā'ib al-mawjūdāt ("The Wonders of Creation", literally "Marvels of things created and miraculous aspects of things existing") in the 13th century, a book that was influential in early modern Islamic society. According to Qazwini's cosmology, the sky is held by God so that it does not fall on Earth. The Earth is considered flat (later Islamic scholars believed that it was round) and surrounded by a series of mountains —including Mount Qaf— that hold it in its place like pegs; the Earth is supported by the Kuyuthan that stands on Bahamut, a giant fish (Arabic: بهموت Bahamūt) dwelling in a cosmic ocean; the ocean is inside a bowl that sits on top of an angel or jinn.

According to certain authors, the Jabal Qaf of Muslim cosmology is a version of Rupes Nigra, a mountain whose ascent —such as Dante's climbing of the Mountain of Purgatory, represents the pilgrim's progress through spiritual states.

== Sufi tradition ==
In some Sufi oral traditions, as conceived by Abd al-Rahman and Attar, Mount Qaf was considered as a realm of consciousness and the goal of a murid (seeker). Hadda Sahib (d. 1903) is said to have visited Mount Qaf in one night and was greeted by the king of peris.

Numerous narratives of Bahr-e Okianus (Ocean Sea) depict a river with no fish, but abounding with angels which greet the spiritually aware. Those without spiritual awareness cannot visit it.

== In literature ==
Mount Kaf (original Turkish: Kafdağı) is the title of a novel by Turkish author Müge İplikçi.

Mount Qaf is frequently referenced in the One Thousand and One Nights as a home of jinn.

Mount Qaf is the setting of the video game Prince of Persia: The Lost Crown.

== See also ==
- Jabulqa and Jabulsa
- The Conference of the Birds (Manṭiq-uṭ-Ṭayr)
- Esoteric interpretation of the Quran
- Ox (Chinese constellation)
- Sutgol, a lake in Turkish mythology
- Paristan, Peris Land
