= Per se =

Per se may refer to:

- per se, a Latin phrase meaning "by itself" or "in itself"
- Per Se (restaurant), a New York City restaurant

== See also ==
- Perse (disambiguation)
- Illegal per se, a term in US law
- Negligence per se, a doctrine in US law
- Pro se legal representation in the United States
- PerSay, a former Israeli voice biometrics technology company
