= Perse =

Perse may refer to:

- Perse (mythology) (also Persa or Perseis), an Oceanid and consort of Helios in Greek mythology
- The Perse School, an independent co-educational school in Cambridge, England
- Stephen Perse Foundation, a family of independent schools in Cambridge and Saffron Walden, England
- Stephen Perse, the founder of The Perse School
- Saint-John Perse, a French diplomat and poet
- Broderie perse, a sewing technique
- Perse, a genus of fossil snails in the family Fasciolariidae
- Virachola perse, a species of butterfly
- A river and a waterfall in Koknese manor park, Aizkraukle district, Latvia
- Pērse, a tributary to Daugava River
- Perse Ende, Indonesian football club
- Finnish profanity § perse

== See also ==
- Persa (disambiguation)
- Persée (disambiguation)
- Persse (disambiguation)
- Persia (disambiguation)
- Pers (disambiguation)
- Purse (disambiguation)
- Percy (disambiguation)
- per se (disambiguation)
