= Dandan =

Mythical sea monster

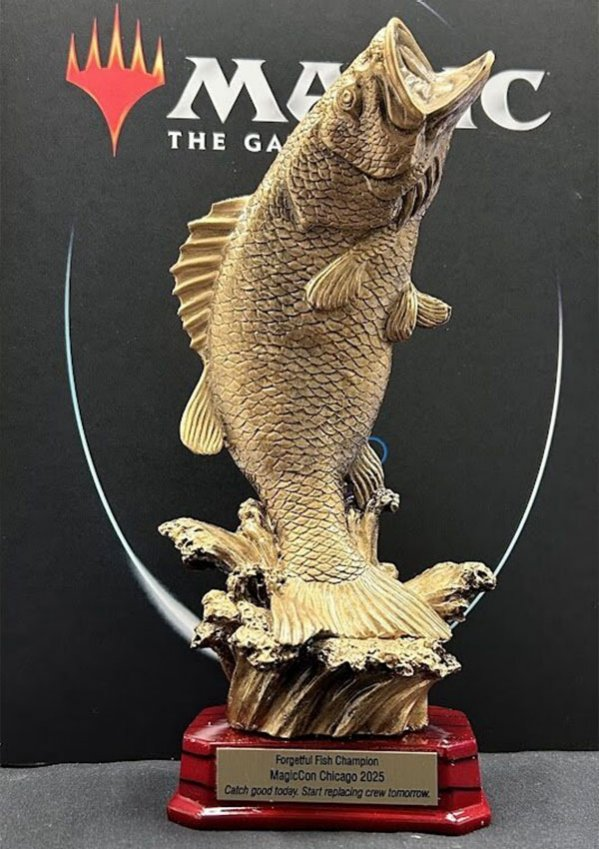
Trophy depicting a dandan at MagicCon: Chicago in 2025

A dandan or dendan is a mythical sea creature from The Book of One Thousand and One Nights (or Arabian Nights) appearing in the tale "Abdullah the Fisherman and Abdullah the Merman", where a merman describes the dandan as the largest and fiercest fish, capable of swallowing large animals in a single mouthful. The fat of the dandan, described as "fat of oxen, yellow as gold and sweet of savour," is used like an ointment to allow humans to survive underwater.

'What is this, O my brother?' asked the fisherman. 'It is the liver-fat of a kind of fish called the dendan,' answered the merman, 'which is the biggest of all fish and the fellest of our foes. Its bulk is greater than that of any beast of the land, and were it to meet a camel or an elephant, it would swallow it at one mouthful.' 'O my brother,' asked Abdallah, 'what eateth this baleful [beast]?' 'It eateth of the beasts of the sea,' replied the merman. 'Hast thou not heard the byword, "Like the fishes of the sea: the strong eateth the weak?"'

In John Payne's translation of the tale, a footnote adds a conjecture that the creature "appears to be a fabulous monster, partaking of the attributes of the shark and the cachalot or sperm-whale" while Richard Burton's translation likewise describes it as "a sun-fish or some such well-fanged monster of the deep". A dandan is capable of swallowing a ship and all its crew in a single gulp, but despite its massive size and lethality, the dandan is highly vulnerable to humans, as consuming human flesh or hearing a human cry can cause it to die instantly.

While multiple translations of the tale mention the dandan, translators like Payne and Burton couldn't find the creature in dictionaries. A footnote in Burton's version adds his "conjecture that 'Dandán' in Persian means a tooth".

A dandan was depicted on a Magic: The Gathering card, from the game's Arabian Nights expansion set. The creature is the subject of a popular fan-made variant of the game called "Forgetful Fish" or "Dandân".

== See also ==
- Bahamut, another large fish in Arabian mythology
