= Müge İplikçi =

Turkish journalist

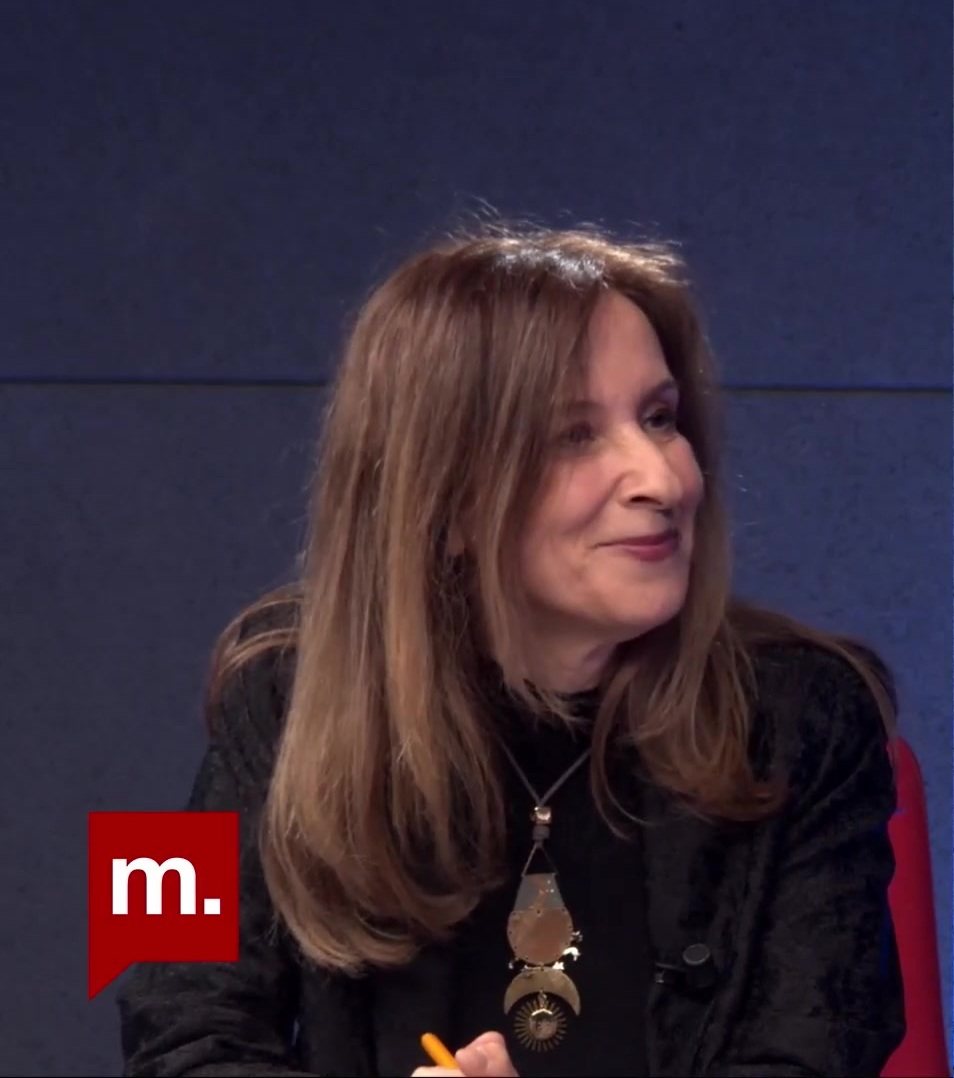
- Iplikci in 2024
- Born: 18 October 1966 (age 59) Istanbul, Türkiye
- Occupation: Journalist and author
- Education: Kadıköy Anatolian High School
- Alma mater: Istanbul University (BA, MA); Ohio State University
- Notable awards: Yaşar Nabi Nayır Youth Award (1996)
- Children: 1

Website
- mugeiplikci.com

Muge Iplikci (born 18 October 1966) is a Turkish journalist, author of contemporary literature and radio presenter.

== Early life and education ==
Iplikci was born in Istanbul, Türkiye, in 1966 and was raised in the Koşuyolu neighbourhood of Kadıköy. She was educated at Kadıköy Anatolian High School.

Iplikci studied a bachelor's degree at the Department of English Language and Literature and a master's degree at the Women's Studies Department of the Institute of Social Sciences, both at Istanbul University (IU). Her masters thesis was titled "Popular Culture and Women: Semiotic Interpretation in Music Videos." She has also studied at Ohio State University, United States.

== Career ==
Iplikci is a Turkish journalist and author of contemporary literature in the form of short stories, novellas and novels. She began her writing career at magazines such as Adam Öykü and bi-monthly short story magazine Eşik Cini. Her novels feature women centred narratives.

In 1996, Iplikci won first place at the Yaşar Nabi Nayır Youth Awards [tr]. In 1997 she won third place at the Haldun Taner Öykü Ödülü Awards [tr]. Some of her short stories have been translated into English, including, Kafdağı which was translated by Nilgün Dungan in 2014.

Alongside writing Iplikci has encouraged reading habits among women in Türkiye's rural neighbourhoods by participating in events organised by the Nilüfer and Konak Municipalities, reading excerpts from her books. She also leads workshops for young journalists, was a member of the Writers in Prison Committee (WIPC) of the Turkish PEN Centre for three years and is chair of the Turkish Women Writers Committee.

Iplikci founded Açık Radyo, which was shut down in 2024 six months after a guest spoke on air about the Armenian genocide. She also produced Sabun Köpüğü and Ömer Madra and presents Zeytin Dalı with Nazan Haydari.

Iplikci was named a BBC 100 Woman in 2014.

== Selected works ==
- Perende (1998)
- Columbus'un Kadınları (2000)
- Arkası Yarın (2001)
- Transit Yolcular (2002)
- Kül ve Yel (2003)
- Cemre (2006)
- Kafdağı (2008, about Mount Qaf)
- Yalancı Şahit (2010, Iplikci's first young adult novel)
- Koşayolu, Dünyalar Kadar (2010)
- Yıkık Kentli Kadınlar (2011)
- Acayip Bir Deniz Yolculuğu (2012)
- Saklambaç (2013)
- Kömür Karası Çocuk (2014)
- Dondurmam Tılsım (2016)
- Sil Baştan (2019)
- Kalpten Seven İnsanlar (2020)
- Ah Be Melek (2023, short stories collected edited by Aslı Güneş)

Her short stories have also been included in Istanbul Noir (2008) and the Book of Istanbul: A City in Short Fiction (2015).

== Awards ==
- 1996, Yaşar Nabi Nayır Youth Award
- 1997, Haldun Taner Award, Third Place
- 2010, ÇGYD Children and Youth Publications Association Jury Special Award

== Personal life ==
Iplikci is married to Ruşen Çakır and they have a son.
