= Purce =

Purce is a surname. Notable people with this surname include:

- Charles L. Purce (1856–1905), American educator
- Jill Purce (born 1947), British voice teacher, therapist, and author
- Les Purce (born 1946), American academic administrator and former politician
- Midge Purce (born 1995), American soccer player

== See also ==
- Purie
- Purse (surname)
