= Per =

Per or PER may refer to:

== Places ==
- Peru (IOC country code)
- Pér, a village in Hungary
- Perthshire (Chapman code), historic county in Scotland

== Science and technology ==
- Physics education research
- Packed Encoding Rules, in computing, an ASN.1 wire format
- Per (storm), a January 2007 storm in Sweden

=== Mathematics ===
- Rate (mathematics), ratio between quantities in different units
- Price–earnings ratio, in finance, a measure of growth in earnings
- Player efficiency rating, a measure of basketball player performance
- Partial equivalence relation, class of relations that are symmetric and transitive

=== Science ===
- Perseus (constellation) (standard astronomical abbreviation)
- Period (gene) or per, that regulates the biological clock and its corresponding protein PER
- Protein efficiency ratio, of food
- PER or peregrinibacteria, a candidate bacterial phylum

== Media and entertainment ==
- PeR (band), a Latvian pop band
- Per (film), a 1975 Danish film

== Transport ==
- Perth Airport (IATA code), in Western Australia
- Penrhiwceiber railway station (National Rail station code), Rhondda Cynon Taf, Wales
- Perambur railway station (Indian Railways station code), Chennai, India

== Other uses ==
- Per (given name), a Scandinavian form of Peter
- Per sign (⅌), a symbol used to indicate a ratio

== See also ==
- Per capita
- Perr (disambiguation)
- Pers (disambiguation)
- Purr (disambiguation)
