= Jabulqa and Jabulsa =

Two mythological cities mentioned in Shi'i hadith

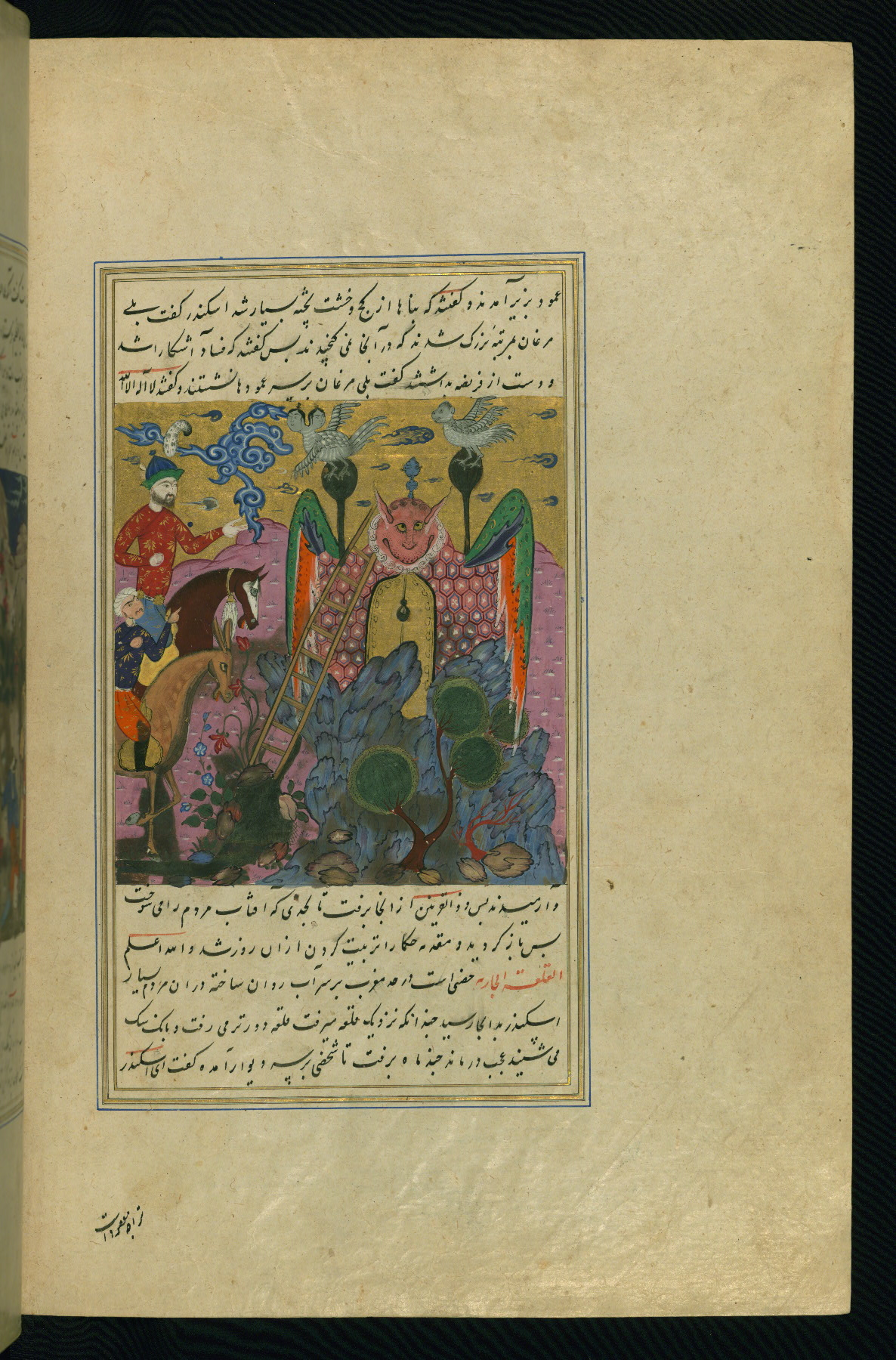
Alexander the Great with two harpies perched on pillars in Jābalasā.

Jabulqa and Jabulsa (Arabic: جابلقا وجابلسا) or Jabalq and Jabars (Arabic: جابلق وجابرس), are two legendary cities mentioned in Islam. They are said to be made of emerald and visited by the Islamic prophet Muhammad in his Night Journey.

Shia books says In a conversation between Muhammad and his cousin Ali ibn Abi Talib, the cities are described as situated in darkness and contiguous to the primeval Mount Qaf. Jabulqa is located in the eastern-most corner of the world and Jabulsa on the western-most one. The figure Dhu al-Qarnayn, mentioned in the Quran, is said to have tried to visit the cities but gave up halfway. However, he was successful in seeing the places where the sun rises and sets. Each city is 12,000 parasangs (at least 36,000 miles) long and wide, with 12,000 gates, and each are guarded by 12,000 men until the Day of Resurrection, when the Qa'im will appear. In the early Basa'ir al-darajat, these cities were inhabited by archetypal male believers who are neither human, jinn nor angels (but whose service to God is similar to those of angels). They appear to be part tellurian and part angelic yet enjoy mystical communion with all the Imāms while awaiting the appearance of the Qa'im. The cities are guarded by 1,000 men each night for a year for each of the 12 fortresses due to enemies called Tharis and Taqil, who behave like Gog and Magog. Muhammad visited the cities in his Night Journey. In the Kitab al-Haft wa-l-azilla (8th–11th century CE), transmitted by Nasayri Shi'a, the sixth Imam al-Sadiq states that the Qa'im will live in these cities.

Later Shi'i scholars, including Muhammad Taqi al-Majlisi (d. 1659) and Muhammad Baqir al-Bahai al-Hamadani (d. 1915), have used these two cities to support the story of the Green Island, the place where the last Imam is said to be hiding. The cities also appear in the works of Shahab al-Din Suhrawardi and Shaykh Ahmad. Bahá'u'lláh, founder of the Bahá'í Faith, in his Javáhiru’l-Asrár (Gems of Divine Mysteries) and other works, interprets Jabulqa and Jabulsa symbolically.
