= Siphonaptera (poem) =

1872 rhyme by Augustus De Morgan

"Siphonaptera" is a name used to refer to the following rhyme by Augustus De Morgan (Siphonaptera being the biological order to which fleas belong):

Great fleas have little fleas upon their backs to bite 'em,
And little fleas have lesser fleas, and so ad infinitum.
And the great fleas themselves, in turn, have greater fleas to go on;
While these again have greater still, and greater still, and so on.

The rhyme appears in De Morgan's A Budget of Paradoxes (1872) along with a discussion of the possibilities that all particles may be made of clustered smaller particles, "and so down, for ever", and that planets and stars may be particles of some larger universe, "and so up, for ever". (Note: De Morgan, Augustus (1872). A Budget of Paradoxes. Longmans, Green, and Company. pp. 376-377. ISBN 978-0-8369-5119-6.)

The lines derive from part of Jonathan Swift's long satirical poem "On Poetry: A Rhapsody" of 1733:

The Vermin only teaze and pinch
Their Foes superior by an Inch.
So, Nat'ralists observe, a Flea
Hath smaller Fleas that on him prey,
And these have smaller Fleas to bite 'em,
And so proceed ad infinitum:
Thus ev'ry Poet, in his Kind
Is bit by him that comes behind[.]

Lewis Fry Richardson adapted the poem to meteorology in 1922: (Note: Richardson, Lewis Fry (1922). Weather Prediction by Numerical Processes. Boston: Cambridge University Press. p. 66. ISBN 9780511618291.)

Big whirls have little whirls
That feed on their velocity,
And little whirls have lesser whirls
And so on to viscosity ...

== See also ==
- Self-similarity
- Turtles all the way down
