= Perr =

Perr may refer to:

- Yechiel Perr (born 1935), American rabbi
- Janet Perr, art director

== See also ==
- George Samuel Perrottet (1793–1870), French botanist who used the botanical author abbreviation "Perr"
- Per (disambiguation)
- Purr (disambiguation)
- PERRS, or 'prolonged electro-retinal response suppression', also known as Bradyopsia
