= Pers =

Pers may refer to:

- Pers, Cantal, France, a commune near Aurillac
- Pers, Deux-Sèvres, France, a former commune near Poitiers
- Pers., taxonomic author abbreviation for mycologist Christiaan Hendrik Persoon
- Persian language

PERS may refer to:

- Personal Emergency Response System
- One of multiple Public Employee Retirement Systems in the United States:
  - CalPERS
  - Oregon Public Employees Retirement System
  - Public Employee Retirement System of Idaho

== See also ==
- Person (disambiguation)
- Perse (disambiguation)
- Per (disambiguation)
