= Turtles all the way down =

Statement of infinite regress

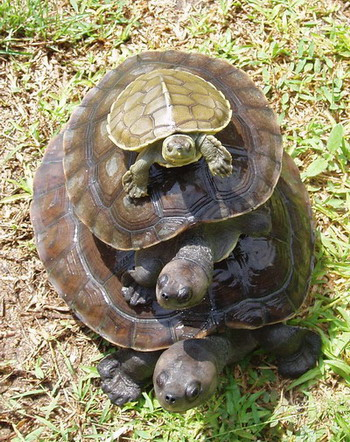
A photograph of a small stack of increasingly larger turtles

"Turtles all the way down" is an expression of the problem of infinite regress. The saying alludes to the mythological idea of a World Turtle that supports a flat Earth on its back. It suggests that this turtle rests on the back of an even larger turtle, which itself is part of a column of increasingly larger turtles that continues indefinitely.

The exact origin of the phrase is uncertain. In the form "rocks all the way down", the saying appears as early as 1838. References to the saying's mythological antecedents, the World Turtle and its counterpart the World Elephant, were made by a number of authors in the 17th and 18th centuries.

The expression has been used to illustrate problems such as the regress argument in epistemology.

== History ==
=== Background in Hindu mythology ===
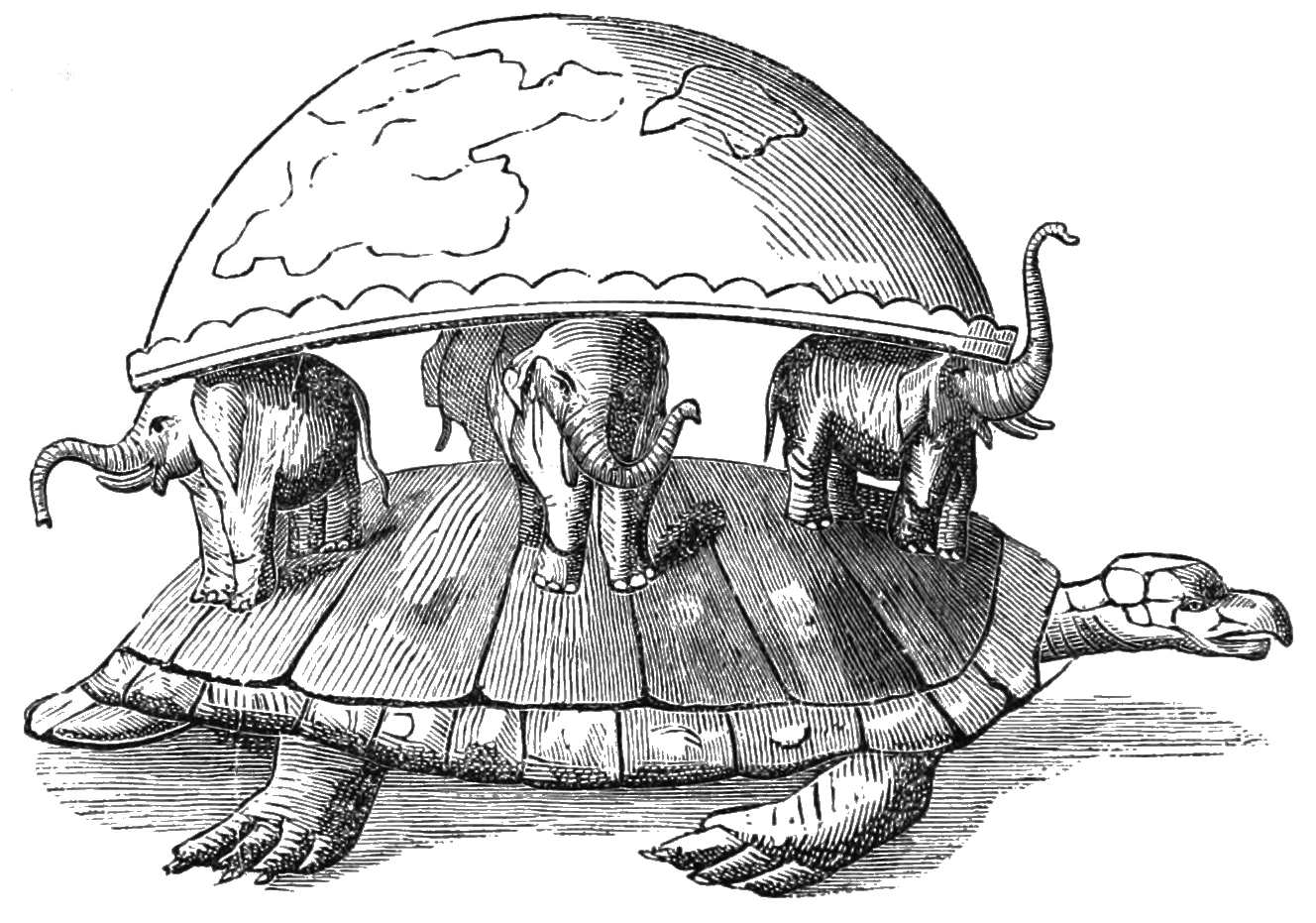
Four World Elephants resting on a World Turtle

Early variants of the saying do not always have explicit references to infinite regression (i.e., the phrase "all the way down"). They often reference stories featuring a World Elephant, World Turtle, or other similar creatures that are claimed to come from Hindu mythology. The first known reference to a Hindu source is found in a letter by Jesuit Emanuel da Veiga (1549–1605), written at Chandagiri on 18 September 1599, in which the relevant passage reads:

Alii dicebant terram novem constare angulis, quibus cœlo innititur. Alius ab his dissentiens volebat terram septem elephantis fulciri, elephantes uero ne subsiderent, super testudine pedes fixos habere. Quærenti quis testudinis corpus firmaret, ne dilaberetur, respondere nesciuit.

Translation:

Others hold that the earth has nine corners by which the heavens are supported. Another disagreeing from these would have the earth supported by seven elephants, and the elephants do not sink down because their feet are fixed on a tortoise. When asked who would fix the body of the tortoise, so that it would not collapse, he didn't know how to answer.

Veiga's account seems to have been received by Samuel Purchas, who has a close paraphrase in his Purchas His Pilgrims (1613/1626), "that the Earth had nine corners, whereby it was borne up by the Heaven. Others dissented, and said, that the Earth was borne up by seven Elephants; the Elephants' feet stood on Tortoises, and they were borne by they know not what." Purchas' account is again reflected by John Locke in his 1689 tract An Essay Concerning Human Understanding, where Locke introduces the story as a trope referring to the problem of induction in philosophical debate. Locke compares one who would say that properties inhere in "Substance" to the Indian who said the world was on an elephant which was on a tortoise, "But being again pressed to know what gave support to the broad-back'd Tortoise, replied, something, he knew not what". The story is also referenced by Henry David Thoreau, who writes in his journal entry of 4 May 1852: "Men are making speeches ... all over the country, but each expresses only the thought, or the want of thought, of the multitude. No man stands on truth. They are merely banded together as usual, one leaning on another and all together on nothing; as the Hindoos made the world rest on an elephant, and the elephant on a tortoise, and had nothing to put under the tortoise."

=== Modern form ===
In the form of "rocks all the way down", the saying dates to at least 1838, when it was printed in an unsigned anecdote in the New-York Mirror about a schoolboy and an old woman living in the woods:

"The world, marm," said I, anxious to display my acquired knowledge, "is not exactly round, but resembles in shape a flattened orange; and it turns on its axis once in twenty-four hours."

"Well, I don't know anything about its axes," replied she, "but I know it don't turn round, for if it did we'd be all tumbled off; and as to its being round, any one can see it's a square piece of ground, standing on a rock!"

"Standing on a rock! but upon what does that stand?"

"Why, on another, to be sure!"

"But what supports the last?"

"Lud! child, how stupid you are! There's rocks all the way down!"

Another version of the saying appeared in an 1854 transcript of remarks by preacher Joseph Frederick Berg addressed to Joseph Barker:

My opponent's reasoning reminds me of the heathen, who, being asked on what the world stood, replied, "On a tortoise." But on what does the tortoise stand? "On another tortoise." With Mr. Barker, too, there are tortoises all the way down. (Vehement and vociferous applause.)

— "Second Evening: Remarks of Rev. Dr. Berg"

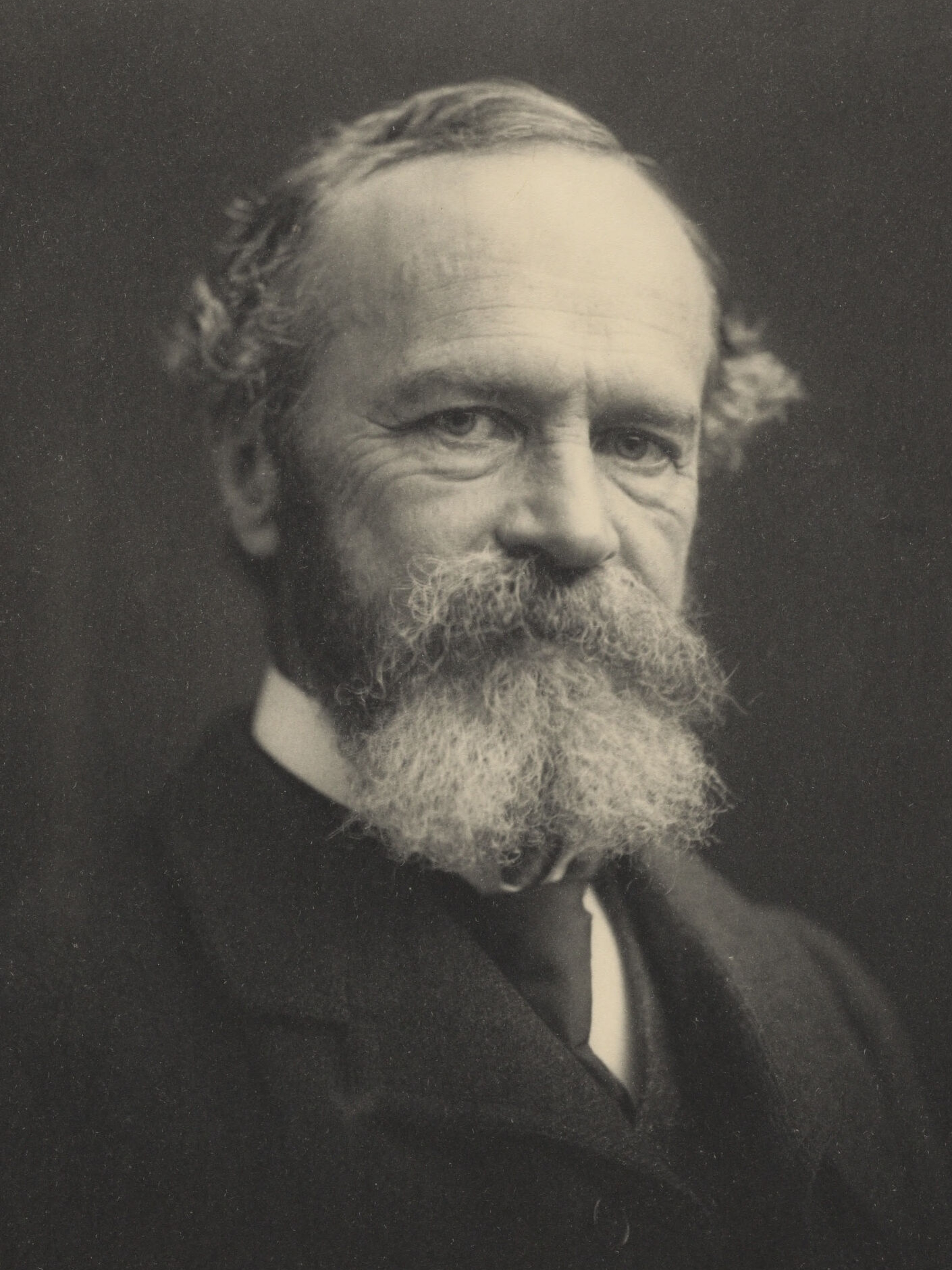
William James

Many 20th-century attributions claim that philosopher and psychologist William James is the source of the phrase. James referred to the fable of the elephant and tortoise several times, but told the infinite regress story with "rocks all the way down" in his 1882 essay, "Rationality, Activity and Faith":

Like the old woman in the story who described the world as resting on a rock, and then explained that rock to be supported by another rock, and finally when pushed with questions said it was "rocks all the way down," he who believes this to be a radically moral universe must hold the moral order to rest either on an absolute and ultimate should or on a series of shoulds "all the way down."

The linguist John R. Ross also associates James with the phrase:

The following anecdote is told of William James.... After a lecture on cosmology and the structure of the solar system, James was accosted by a little old lady.

"Your theory that the sun is the centre of the solar system, and the earth is a ball which rotates around it has a very convincing ring to it, Mr. James, but it's wrong. I've got a better theory," said the little old lady.

"And what is that, madam?" inquired James politely.

"That we live on a crust of earth which is on the back of a giant turtle."

Not wishing to demolish this absurd little theory by bringing to bear the masses of scientific evidence he had at his command, James decided to gently dissuade his opponent by making her see some of the inadequacies of her position.

"If your theory is correct, madam," he asked, "what does this turtle stand on?"

"You're a very clever man, Mr. James, and that's a very good question," replied the little old lady, "but I have an answer to it. And it's this: The first turtle stands on the back of a second, far larger, turtle, who stands directly under him."

"But what does this second turtle stand on?" persisted James patiently.

To this, the little old lady crowed triumphantly,

"It's no use, Mr. James—it's turtles all the way down."

— J. R. Ross, Constraints on Variables in Syntax, 1967

== Turtle world, infinite regress and explanatory failure ==
The mythological idea of a turtle world is often used as an illustration of infinite regresses. An infinite regress is an infinite series of entities governed by a recursive principle that determines how each entity in the series depends on or is produced by its predecessor. The main interest in infinite regresses is due to their role in infinite regress arguments. An infinite regress argument is an argument against a theory based on the fact that this theory leads to an infinite regress. For such an argument to be successful, it has to demonstrate not just that the theory in question entails an infinite regress but also that this regress is vicious. There are different ways in which a regress can be vicious. The idea of a turtle world exemplifies viciousness due to explanatory failure: it does not solve the problem it was formulated to solve. Instead, it assumes already in disguised form what it was supposed to explain. This is akin to the informal fallacy of begging the question. In one interpretation, the goal of positing the existence of a world turtle is to explain why the earth seems to be at rest instead of falling down: because it rests on the back of a giant turtle. In order to explain why the turtle itself is not in free fall, another, even bigger turtle is posited, and so on, resulting in a world that is turtles all the way down. Despite its shortcomings in clashing with modern physics, and due to its ontological extravagance, this theory seems to be metaphysically possible, assuming that space is infinite, thereby avoiding an outright contradiction. But it fails because it has to assume rather than explain at each step that there is another thing that is not falling. It does not explain why nothing at all is falling.

== In epistemology and other disciplines ==
The metaphor is used as an example of the problem of infinite regress in epistemology, particularly in discussions of foundationalism, where it is invoked to illustrate the difficulty of a chain of justification without an ultimate ground. As written by Johann Gottlieb Fichte in 1794:

If there is not to be any (system of human knowledge dependent upon an absolute first principle) two cases are only possible. Either there is no immediate certainty at all, and then our knowledge forms many series or one infinite series, wherein each theorem is derived from a higher one, and this again from a higher one, etc., etc. We build our houses on the earth, the earth rests on an elephant, the elephant on a tortoise, the tortoise again—who knows on what?—and so on ad infinitum. True, if our knowledge is thus constituted, we can not alter it; but neither have we, then, any firm knowledge. We may have gone back to a certain link of our series, and have found every thing firm up to this link; but who can guarantee us that, if we go further back, we may not find it ungrounded, and shall thus have to abandon it? Our certainty is only assumed, and we can never be sure of it for a single following day.

David Hume references the story in his 1779 work Dialogues Concerning Natural Religion when arguing against God as an unmoved mover:

Now, as well as the question concerning the cause of the being whom you suppose to be the author of nature, your system of anthropomorphism confronts us with another question, concerning the cause of the mental world that you see as causing the material world—that is, the cause of God's plan. How can we satisfy ourselves about that? Haven't we the same reason to see that mental world as caused by another mental world, or new force of thinking? But if we stop there, refusing to raise the question about the cause of God's plan, why do we go as far as God's plan? Why not stop at the material world? How can we satisfy ourselves without going on to infinity? Not that there is any satisfaction in the infinite sequence of causes of causes of.... Let us remember the story of the Indian philosopher and his elephant: he thought that the earth needed something to hold it up, and supposed it rested on an elephant, which he then supposed rested on a tortoise.... The story was never more applicable than it is to the present subject, switching from a spatial to a causal interpretation of 'rest on'. If the material world rests causally on a mental world that is similar to it, this mental world must rest on some other; and so on without end. It would be better, therefore, never to look beyond the present material world. By supposing it to contain within itself the causes of its order, we are really taking it to be God; and the sooner we arrive at that divine being, the better. When you go one step beyond the system of the familiar world, you only stir people up into asking questions that can't possibly be answered.

Bertrand Russell also mentions the story in his 1927 lecture Why I Am Not a Christian while discounting the First Cause argument intended to be a proof of God's existence:

If everything must have a cause, then God must have a cause. If there can be anything without a cause, it may just as well be the world as God, so that there cannot be any validity in that argument.

== Cultural representations ==
The concept of "turtles all the way down" features in a variety of modern contexts.

Author Dr. Seuss featured a visual of turtles in his book Yertle the Turtle and Other Stories, in which a turtle king stacks an increasingly tall throne on top of his subjects to conquer all that he sees, until the turtle at the bottom burps, and the throne collapses. Seuss stated that the king is a metaphor for Adolf Hitler with his kingdom and the stack of turtles being his regime.

U.S. Supreme Court Justice Antonin Scalia discussed his "favored version" of the concept in a footnote to his 2006 opinion in Rapanos v. United States:

In our favored version, an Eastern guru affirms that the earth is supported on the back of a tiger. When asked what supports the tiger, he says it stands upon an elephant; and when asked what supports the elephant he says it is a giant turtle. When asked, finally, what supports the giant turtle, he is briefly taken aback, but quickly replies "Ah, after that it is turtles all the way down."

Several musicians have made use of the phrase as song titles. American hardcore band Every Time I Die included a song “Turtles All the Way Down” on their 2009 album New Junk Aesthetic. "Turtles All the Way Down" is the name of a song by country artist Sturgill Simpson. "Gamma Goblins ('Its Turtles All The Way Down' Mix)" is a remix by Ott for the 2002 Hallucinogen album In Dub.

Turtles All the Way Down is also a 2017 novel by John Green.

== See also ==
- Axiom of foundation – Axiom of set theory
- Cartesian theater – Philosophical term
- Chicken or the egg – Causality dilemma
- Cosmological argument – Argument for the existence of God
- Discworld – Fantasy book series by Terry Pratchett
- God of the gaps – Theological argument
- Homunculus argument – Informal fallacy
- Kurma – Tortoise form of the Hindu god Vishnu
- Matryoshka doll – Russian nested wooden toy
- Münchhausen trilemma – Thought experiment used to demonstrate the impossibility of proving any truth
- Primum Mobile – Outermost moving sphere in the geocentric model of the universe
- Primum movens – Postulated primary cause of all activity in the universe
- Problem of the creator of God – Philosophical problem
- Pyrrhonism – Ancient Greek school of philosophical skepticism
- The Siphonaptera – 1872 rhyme by Augustus De Morgan
- Teleological argument – Argument for the existence of God
- Transfinite induction – Mathematical concept
- Turtle Island (Native American folklore) – Indigenous American name for Earth or North America
- World Turtle – Giant turtle supporting or containing the world
- Yertle the Turtle and Other Stories – 1958 picture book collection by Dr. Seuss
