= Purr (disambiguation) =

A purr is a sound in cat communication.

Purr may also refer to:

- Purr (Pillow Pal), a Pillow Pal tiger made by Ty, Inc.
- Purr (fragrance), a fragrance by Katy Perry
- PURRR, a fictional organization [P.U.R.R.R. - Philanthropic Union for Rescue, Relief and Recuperation of Cats] in "The Hidden Tiger" episode of The Avengers (TV series)
- Purring, an alternative name for the combat sport of Shin-kicking
- Purr, a 1999 album by ska punk band Dance Hall Crashers

== See also ==
- Per (disambiguation)
- Perr (disambiguation)
