= Sutgol =

Turkish mythical lake

Sutgol (Turkish: Sütgöl, "Milk Lake") or Akgol (Turkish: Akgöl, "White Lake") is a lake in Turkish mythology. It is a life-giving fountain. Before the birth of a child, the Goddess Umay takes a drop from the lake and gives it to the child to give him a spirit. According to some sources, this mission is done by Ayzıt or Yıyık. The lake is located behind the mythological Mountain Kaf, or on the third floor of the sky.

There are winged horses near the lake. When Hızır went there, wanted to take them. He dropped some wine into the lake, and easily caught the horses. He broke off the horses' wings so they could not escape, and according to the myth, today's horses originated this way.

== Sources ==
- Türk Mitolojisi Sözlüğü, Pınar Karaca (in Turkish)
- Türk Mitolojisi / Murat Uraz (in Turkish)
