= Falak (Arabian legend) =

Giant serpent in Arabian legend

Creature information
- Grouping: Serpent
- Sub grouping: Cosmic serpent
- Similar entities: Leviathan, Jörmungandr
- Folklore: Arabian mythology; mentioned in One Thousand and One Nights

Origin
- First attested: One Thousand and One Nights, Arabian Nights (e.g., 496th & 497th nights)
- Known for: Resides in the seventh hell; so powerful that only the fear of God restrains it from swallowing all creation
- Region: Arab world / Middle Eastern mythology
- Habitat: Seventh hell, beneath Bahamut (the cosmic fish)
- Details: Immune to fire and heat; symbol of cosmic restraint; part of cosmological hierarchy under Bahamut, bull (Kujata), and angel

Falak (Arabic: فلك) is the giant serpent mentioned in the One Thousand and One Nights. He resides below Bahamut, the giant fish which carries (along with a bull and an angel) the rest of the universe including six hells, the earths and the heavens. Falak itself resides in the seventh hell below everything else and it is said to be so powerful that only its fear of the greater power of God prevents it from swallowing all the creation above.

== See also ==
- Leviathan
- Surtr
