= Dudley Persse =

Dudley Persse (1625–1699) was an Anglo-Irish landlord and Anglican priest.

He was a grandson of the Rev. Robert Persse (died 1612), who originated in Northumberland but settled in Ireland in the late 16th century and was buried at Bodenstown, County Kildare. Dudley's father (Henry of Clane) was one of three sons born to Robert Persse. Henry married an Elizabeth (surname unknown) and was dead by 1673, Sybil and Dudley being his only two children.

Dudley Persse was educated at Trinity College, Dublin, matriculating in 1641 and was ordained into the Anglican Church. He served as Dean of Kilmacduagh. and Archdeacon of Tuam.

He purchased the Spring Garden estate in County Galway, where he lived until he purchased Cregarosta in the same county, between Loughrea and Gort. He built a house there, which he named Roxborough in honour of Northumberland and which was thereafter was the seat of the Persse family for 245 years until destroyed by fire in 1922 during the Irish Civil War.

He married Sarah, daughter of John Crofton of Lisnadurn, County Roscommon and had issue:

- Henry High Sheriff of County Galway, 1701
- William High Sheriff of County Galway, 1711
- Catherine, married Major Hugh Galbraith of Capard
- Alice, married Captain William Colles of Sligo
- Daughter (name unknown), married a Mr. Nethercott
- Daughter (name unknown), married Mr. Ormsby of Tubbervaddy
- Daughter (name unknown), married Mr. Hickman of County Clare
- Sarah, married John Blakeney of Castle Blakeney

== Genealogy ==
Persse founded a dynasty that was to dominate society in Galway and Connacht into the early 20th century. The family was prolific, members including:

- William Persse, Irish volunteer (c. 1728 – 1802)
- Henry Stratford Persse, writer (died 1833)
- Sarah Persse, suffragist, fl. 1899
- Augusta, Lady Gregory, Irish nationalist, landlord, author and dramatist (1852–1932)
- Hugh Lane, Irish art dealer, collector and gallery director (1875–1915)
