= PerSay =

- Industry: Speaker recognition technology
- Founded: February 2000
- Founder: Renana Peres
- Headquarters: Ra'anana, Israel
- Area served: Worldwide
- Key people: Renana Peres, Founder and first CEO; Almog Aley-Raz, CEO; Ariel Freidenberg, Executive Vice President of Global Sales and Business Development
- Products: VocalPassword, FreeSpeech
- Owner: Nuance Communications
- Number of employees: 18
- Website: www.persay.com

PerSay was an Israeli start-up company specializing in Voice Biometrics technology. Founded in 2000, its voice biometrics systems are used in the banking, insurance, governments, and telecommunications industries worldwide.

== History ==
PerSay was founded in February 2000 as a spin-off of Verint Systems (NASDAQ: VRNT), part of the Comverse Technology (Pinksheets: CMVT) group. Its headquarters is in Ra'anana, with an office in New York City. Its main investor was SKFT, which handled the venture capital activity of the Shrem Fudim Kelner group. In April 2004 the company was valued at $2.9 to $3.7 million. In 2010 the company was sold for an undisclosed amount (estimated at 10M-20M USD) to Nuance Communications.

== Products ==
PerSay markets the following products:

- VocalPassword, a biometric speaker identification system which verifies the speaker during an interaction using a voice application
- FreeSpeech, a text-independent biometric speaker identification system which verifies a person's identity in the course of natural conversation
- S.P.I.D., an audio-processing system which searches for a target's voice in a volume of intercepted calls

PerSay's VocalPassword speaker identification technology has been acquired by Bank Leumi, China Merchants Bank, Bank Hapoalim, Israel Discount Bank, and Caja Madrid; British Telecom, Bell Canada, Vodafone, and Global Bilgi/Turkcell; Sandata, Planet Payment of New York, Huawei, and Barclays Capital and Morgan Stanley.
