= Jñānarāja =

Indian astronomer and mathematician

Jñānarāja (a name meaning "king of knowledge") was an Indian astronomer and mathematician, author of Siddhāntasundara ("noble treatise"), a Hindu astronomical treatise written in ca. AD 1500.

The work contains a comprehensive summary of the system of Hindu astronomy, including methods of computing planetary positions and eclipses, paired with Hindu astronomy and its role in Hindu tradition, aiming at a synthesis between the tenets of Indian astronomy and the mythological accounts given of the cosmos in the Puranas.

The Siddhāntasundara is part of the "Maharashtra School", a late flourishing of Hindu mathematics standing alongside the contemporary and better-known Kerala School.
