= Persée =

Persée is the French word for Perseus.

Persée can refer to:

- Persée (web portal), digital library of open access scholarly journals

French navy

- French submarine Persée
- Persée (M649), French Tripartite-class minehunter

Opera

- Persée (Perseus), opera by J.-B. Lully
- Persée (Perseus), opera by F.-A. D. Philidor
