= Non sequitur =

Non sequitur may refer to:

- Non sequitur (fallacy), an invalid argument whose conclusion is not supported by its premises
- Non sequitur (literary device), an irrelevant, often humorous comment to a preceding topic or statement
- Non Sequitur (comic strip), a comic strip by Wiley Miller
- "Non Sequitur" (Star Trek: Voyager), an episode of Star Trek: Voyager
- Sequitur, a musical project by Karlheinz Essl Jr.

== See also ==
- Sequitur algorithm, a recursive algorithm
