= Purser (disambiguation) =

A purser is the person on a ship responsible for the handling of money on board.

Purser may also refer to:

- Purser (surname), a surname
- Purser (Pirate), the pseudonym for the Famous English Pyrat Thomas Walton; hanged 1583.

== See also ==
- Cayley–Purser
- Purser-Hallard
