= Purje =

Purje is a surname. Notable people with the surname include:

- Ats Purje (born 1985), Estonian footballer
- Eino Purje (1900–1984), Finnish middle-distance runner
