= William Persse =

Col. William Persse (c. 1728 – 19 January 1803) was an Irish Volunteer.

Persse was born at Roxborough House, County Galway, a great-grandson of Dudley Persse of Northumberland (see House of Percy), who settled in Galway during the Cromwellian era, and was the ancestor of all subsequent Persses in the county. In 1782, he was one of the five delegates from Galway representing the Volunteers at the Grand National Convention, alongside Edmond Kirwan, Peter D'Arcy, Major William Burke and Colonel Walter Lambert. He supported the full emancipation of Catholics in the United Kingdom.

In 1777, he had founded the county's first volunteer unit. The Roxborough Volunteers are commemorated with a bridge just inside the gates of Roxborough, with an inscription, dated 1783. He personally knew both George Washington and John Wesley, the latter being a guest at his Galway home, Roxborough, in May 1785. Washington and Persse corresponded from after 1783 to about 1795, with Persse advising Washington on planting in the gardens of Mount Vernon.

Persse's great-granddaughter was the Irish nationalist landlord Lady Augusta Gregory.
