= World Elephant =

Eight legendary elephants of Hinduism

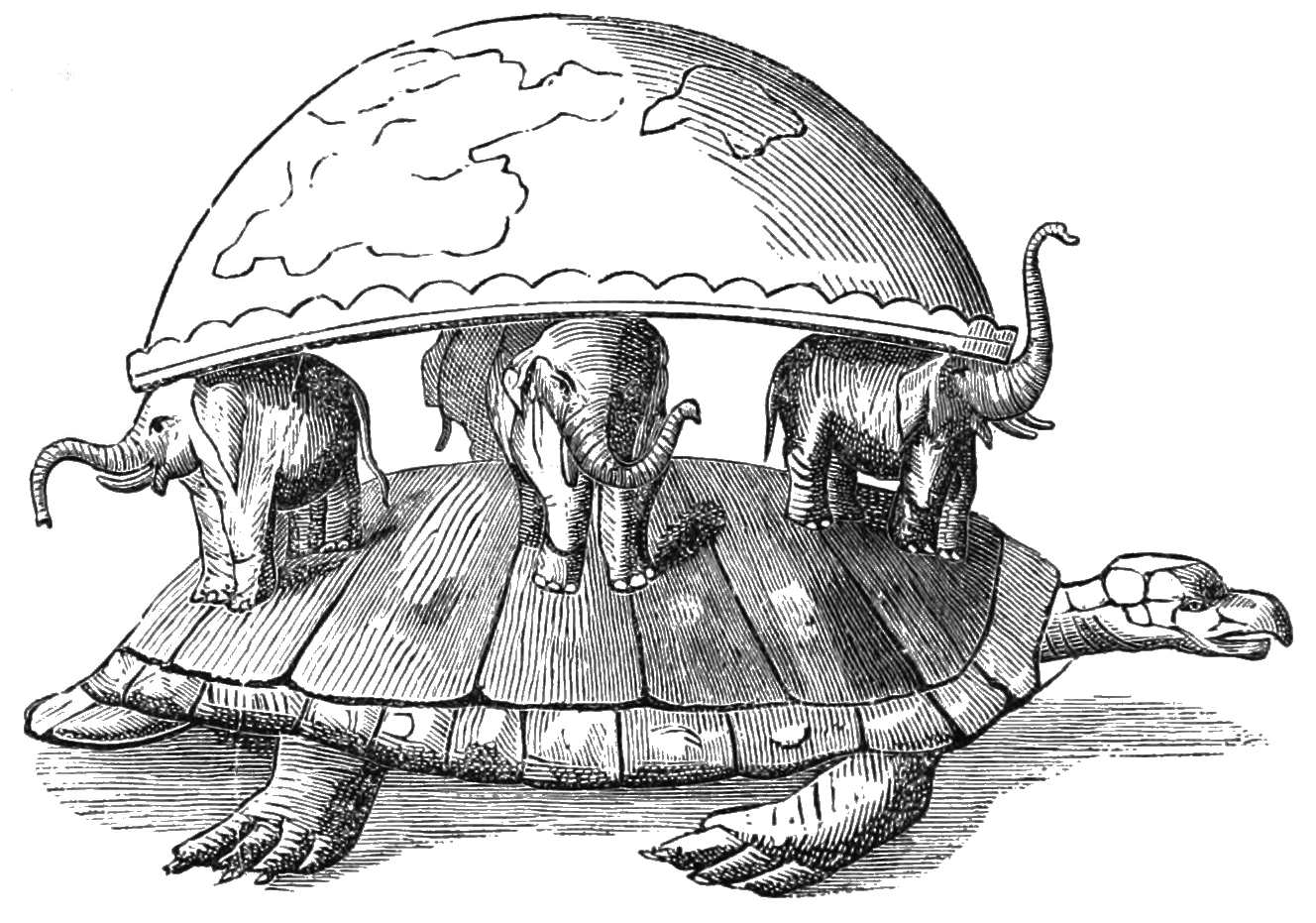
An 1877 American drawing of the world supported on the backs of four elephants, themselves resting on the back of a turtle.

The Ashtadiggajas (Sanskrit: अष्टदिग्गज, romanized: Aṣṭadiggajas, lit. 'eight elephants of the quarters') is a group of eight legendary elephants that appear in Hindu cosmology, serving as the guardians of the eight zones of the universe. There are also eight female elephants that stand beside the Ashtadiggajas, referred to as the Ashtadikkarinis.

== List ==
There are a total of eight Ashtadiggajas and Ashtadikkarinis that stand guard over the eight zones:

Direction	Male	Female
East	Airāvata	Abhramu
South-east	Puṇḍarīka	Kapilā
South	Vāmana	Piṅgalā
South-west	Kumuda	Anupamā
West	Añjana	Tāmrakarṇī
North-west	Puṣpadanta	Śubhradantī
North	Sārvabhauma	Aṅganā
North-east	Supratīka	Añjanāvatī

== Literature ==
Besides the Ashtadiggajas, there are four elephants who support the earth from the four directions from the netherworld, whose names are given in the Ramayana: Virūpākṣa (east), Mahāpadmasama (south), Saumanasa (west), and Bhadra (north).

The Matanga Lila associates the Ashtadiggajas as vehicles (vahana) of the Ashtadikpala, eight divine guardians of the directions. It states that the Unborn (Creator) took half shells of the cosmic egg in his hands; the Ashtadiggajas - eight elephants led by Airavata emerged from the shell in the right hand as the sages chanted the saman hymns; while the eight cow-elephants came from the left shell as their consorts. Ashtadiggajas reproduced with their consorts, populating the forests, the mountains with elephants. They aided the gods in defeating the demons in battle.

== In popular culture ==
The popular rendition of the World Turtle supporting one or several World Elephants is recorded in 1599 in a letter by Emanual de Veiga. Wilhelm von Humboldt claimed that the idea of a world-elephant may be due to a confusion, caused by the Sanskrit noun Nāga having the dual meaning of "serpent" and "elephant" (named for its serpent-like trunk), thus representing a corrupted account of the world-serpent.

Love and Death
On the wondrous dais rose a throne,
And he its pedestal whose lotus hood
With ominous beauty crowns his horrible
Sleek folds, great Mahapudma; high displayed
He bears the throne of Death. There sat supreme
With those compassionate and lethal eyes,
Who many names, who many natures holds;
Yama, the strong pure Hades sad and subtle,
Dharma, who keeps the laws of old untouched.

Brewer's Dictionary of Phrase and Fable lists Maha-pudma and Chukwa are names from a "popular rendition of a Hindu myth in which the tortoise Chukwa supports the elephant Maha-pudma, which in turn supports the world". The spelling Mahapudma originates as a misprint of Mahapadma in Sri Aurobindo's 1921 retelling of a story of the Mahabharata.

In Terry Pratchett's Discworld novels, the Disc sits atop the shoulders of four elephants that stand on top of a giant turtle. There is a legendary fifth elephant that plummeted into the ground and left a legacy of valuable mineable materials.

== See also ==
- Dikpalas
- Gaja
- World Turtle
