= Purse (surname) =

Purse is an English and Scottish surname. Notable people with the surname include:

- Daniel Gugel Purse Sr. (1839–1908), American businessman
- Darren Purse (born 1977), English footballer
- John Purse (born 1972), American cyclist
- Charles Sanders Peirce (pronounced "Purse") (1839–1914), American philosopher and scientist
