= Ibn al-Wardi =

14th-century Arab poet; 15th-century Arab geographer

Abū Ḥafs Zayn al-Dīn ʻUmar ibn al-Muẓaffar Ibn al-Wardī (Arabic: عمر ابن مظفر ابن الوردي), known as Ibn al-Wardi, was an Arab geographer (died circa 1446, sometimes listed as late as 1457). He was the author of Kharīdat al-ʿAjā'ib wa farīdat al-gha'rāib (The Pearl of wonders and the Uniqueness of strange things), a geographical treatise with sections on natural history.

The name Abū Ḥafs Zayn al-Dīn ʻUmar ibn al-Muẓaffar Ibn al-Wardī (ابن الوردي) may also refer to this man's grandfather (born in Maarat al-Numan, Syria, 691 AH (1291/1292 CE) died 749 AH (1348/1349 CE)), a historian and poet known for his writings about the plague in Syria before his death. Their family descended from Caliph Abu Bakr. He wrote Tarikh Ibn al-Wardi (The History by Ibn al-Wardi).

The two men are often confused for each other, particularly in the western world. Gorton's biography, conflating the two, reads:

An Arabian geographer and poet of eminence in the 14th century. In his youth he filled the office of deputy to the hakim, or principal judge of the city of Aleppo; but he quit the judicature to devote his time to the cultivation of science. He composed for the use of the governor of Aleppo, a curious treatise on geography, entitled "The Pearl of Wonders." He was also the author of an abridgment of the chronicle of Abufeda, poems, &c. His death took place in 1330. Several portions of his geographical work have been published by the literati of France and Germany.

== Tarikh Ibn al-Wardi ==
Ibn al-Wardi (Sr.) was an eyewitness of the Black Death; he died in Aleppo of plague on 27 Dhū aI-Hijjah 749 (18 March 1349).

His Tarikh ("history," "annals") is considered an abridgement of "the chronicle of Abu al-Fida with a continuation from 729/1329 to 749/1349." That Arab history by Abulfeda,Tarikh al-Mukhtasar fi Akhbar al-Bashar (An Abridgment of the History at the Human Race, or History of Abu al-Fida), was itself an extension of an earlier work, The Complete History by Ali ibn al-Athir.

== Risālah al-naba’ ‘an al-waba’ ==
Ibn Al-Wardi's (Sr.) risalah ("message"), translated by Dols as "An Essay on the Report of the Pestilence," includes his firsthand account of the plague in Syria:

China was not preserved from it nor could the strongest fortress hinder it. The plague afflicted the Indians in India. It weighed upon the Sind. It seized with its hand and ensnared even the lands of the Uzbeks. How many backs did it break in what is Transoxiana! The plague increased and spread further. It attacked the Persians, extended its steps toward the land of the Khitai, and gnawed away at the Crimea. It pelted Rum with live coals and led the outrage to Cyprus and the islands. The plague destroyed mankind in Cairo. Its eye was cast upon Egypt, and behold, the people were wide-awake.... The plague attacked Gaza, and it shook ‘Asqalan severyly. The plague oppressed Acre. The scourge came to Jerusalem …. It, then, hastened its pace and attacked the entire maritime plain. The plague trapped Sidon and descended unexpectedly upon Beirut, cunningly. Next, it directed the shooting of its arrows to Damascus.

The main English translation in use today, by Michael Dols, "is presented in simple prose without regard to the original's meter, rhyme, and elaborate literary conceits".

== Kharīdat al-ʿAjā'ib wa farīdat al-gha'rāib ==
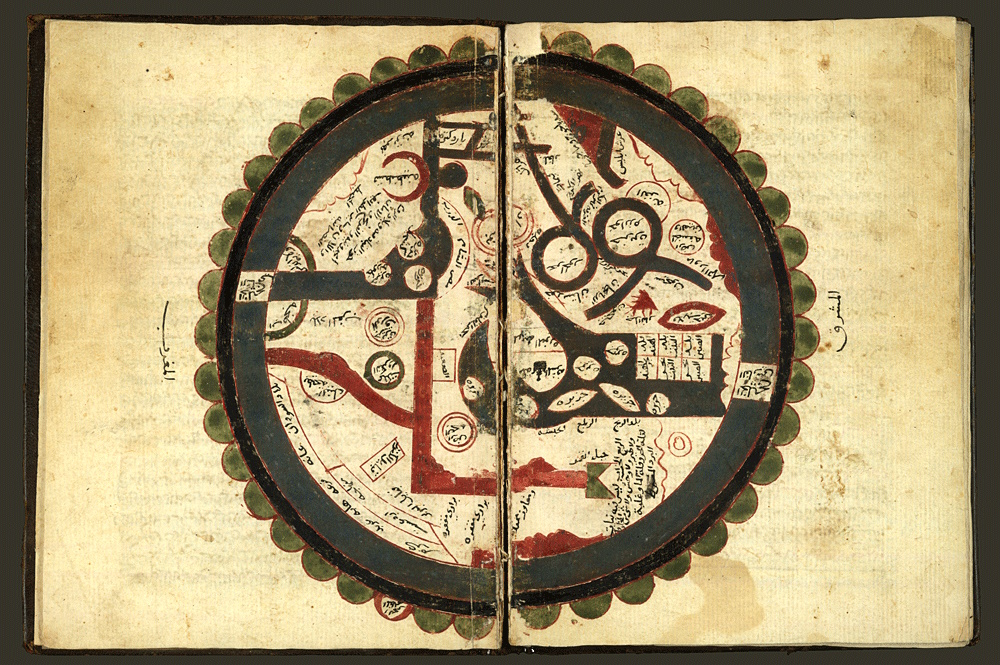
Ibn al-Wardi's atlas of the world, a manuscript copied in 17th century

The Kharīdat (written circa 1419) by Ibn Al-Wardi (Jr.) summed up the geographical knowledge of the Arabic world of the time, referring to climate, terrain, fauna and flora, population, way of living, existing states and their governments in individual regions of the world. The work was accompanied by a coloured world map and a picture of Ka'bah.

Although in the book al-Wardi credits al-Mas'udi, al-Tusi and several other sources, Mohamed Bencheneb claimed it is a plagiarism of a book by Egyptian writer Najm ad-Dīn Aḥmad ibn Ḥamdān ibn Shabib al-Ḥanbali, entitled Jāmi ʿal-Funūn wa-Salwat al-Maḥzūn. Bencheneb suggests the first chapter may either be taken from Yaqut al-Hamawi's Mu'jam ul-Buldān or have been received via al-Hanbali.
