= Muḥammad al-Kisāʾī =

Muḥammad ibn ʿAbd Allāh al-Kisāʾī
- محمد بن عبد الله الكيسائي
- Born: ca. 10th/11th century CE

Academic background
- Influences: Abd Allah ibn Salam; Ka'b al-Ahbar; Wahb ibn Munabbih

Academic work
- Era: Classical / Medieval Islamic period
- Language: Arabic
- Main interests: Biblical Prophets, folk-religion, Qurʾanic tales, exegesis
- Notable works: Qiṣaṣ al-Anbiyāʾ (Stories of the Prophets)

Muḥammad ibn ʿAbd Allāh al-Kisāʾī (Arabic: محمد الكسائي) (ca. 1100 CE) wrote a work on Stories of the Prophets (Qiṣaṣ al-Anbiyā). It has been characterised as "one of the best-loved versions of the prophetic tales".

== Work ==
Al-Kisāʾī produced a collection of Stories of the Prophets; according to Wheeler M. Thackston, its date "is highly uncertain, although the prevalent opinion is that it must have been written not long before 1200". It includes exegetic information not found elsewhere and elaborates on earlier exegesis with a fuller narrative and folkloric elements from oral traditions now lost that often parallel those from Christianity. He includes two prophets, Shem and Eleazar, not named in later literature as prophets. The work often cites ʿAbd Allāh ibn Salām (d. 663), Kaʿb al-Aḥbār (d. c. 652), and Wahb ibn Munabbih (d. c. 730), who were understood as foundational authorities on pre-Islamic Abrahamic traditions in early Islam. It was later translated into Persian by Muḥammad ibn Ḥasan al-Daydūzamī.

=== Editions and translations ===
- al-Kisāʾī, Qiṣaṣ al-anbiyāʾ / Vita Prophetarum, ed. by I. Eisenberg (Leiden 1922–23)
- Muḥammad ibn ʿAbd Allāh al-Kisāʾī, The Tales of the Prophets of al-Kisa’i, trans. by Wheeler M. Thackston Jr. ([Chicago, IL]: Great Books of the Islamic World, 1997), ISBN 187103101X
