= Chattel =

Chattel may refer to:

- Chattel, an alternative name for tangible personal property
- A chattel house, a type of West Indian dwelling
- A chattel mortgage, a security interest over tangible personal property
- Chattel slavery, a form of slavery in which the enslaved are treated as property
- The Chattel, a 1916 silent film
