= Henry Stratford Persse =

Henry Stratford Persse (1769–1833) was an Irish writer.

Persse was a younger son of the Persse family of Roxborough, and of the same family as Lady Gregory. Because he inherited not wealth or land estate, he was a Landwaiter of the Customs House in Galway for about twenty years before his death in 1833. He was married to Anne Sadleir and had twenty-two children. Ten of these survived infancy.

Of these, Richard, Dudley and Theophilus were sent by their father to America in 1821 with various siblings following after. Their correspondence has been edited and published, providing a valuable insight to the mindset of the Irish middle class in the early 19th century.
