= Leviathan =

Biblical sea monster

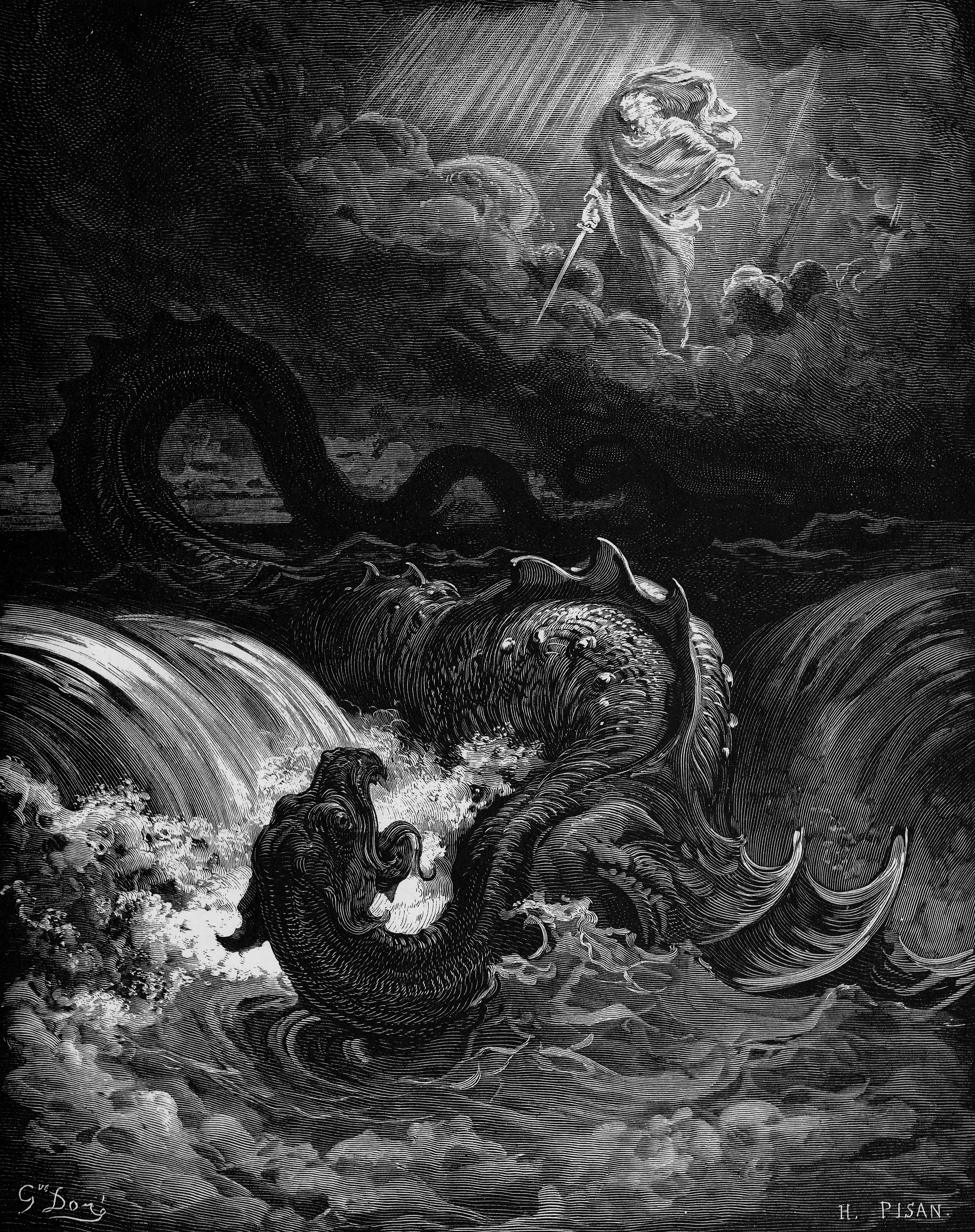
The Destruction of Leviathan by Gustave Doré (1865)

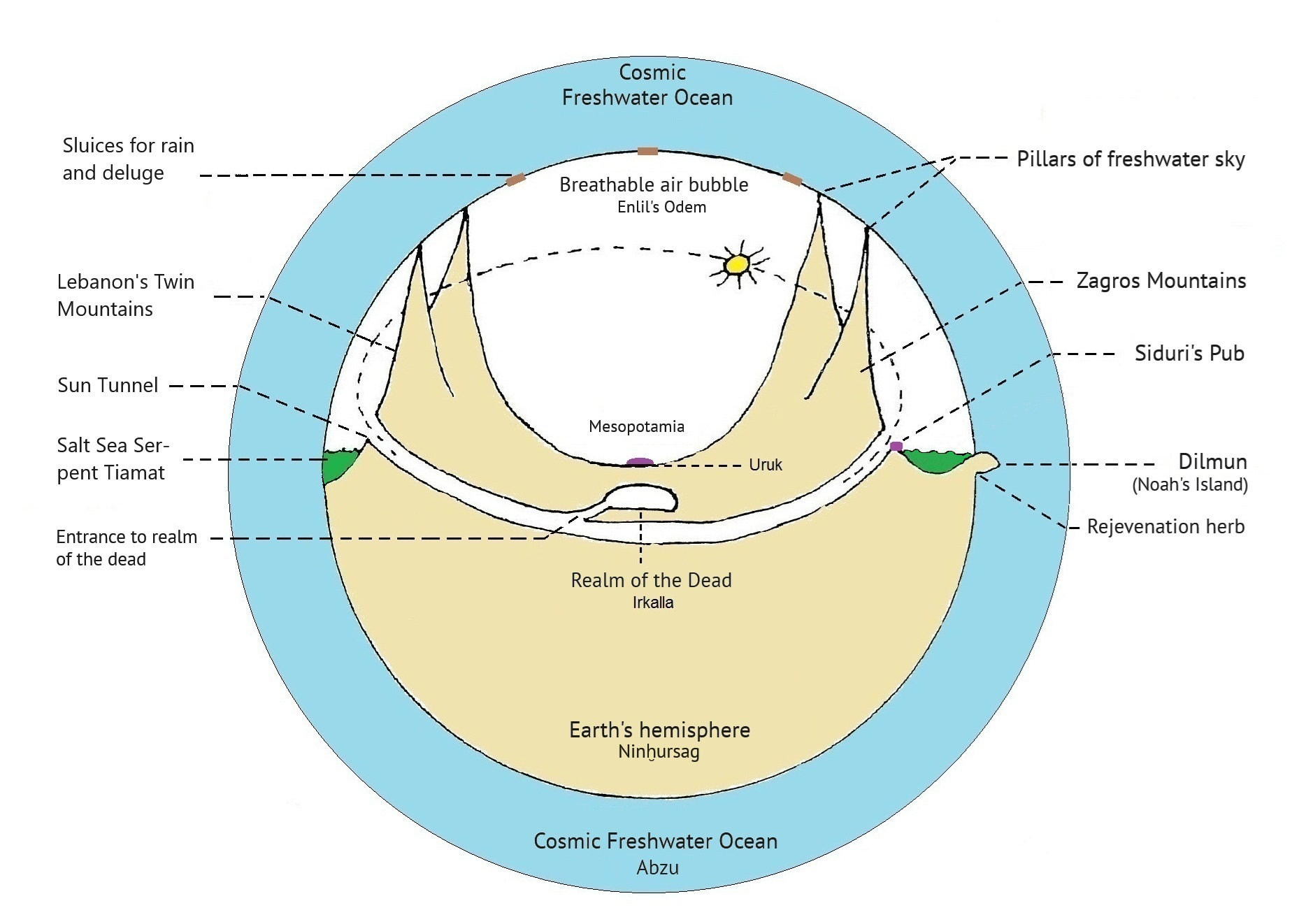
The circular salt sea Tiamat (green) and sphere of cosmic freshwater ocean Abzu are pre-existent deities in Sumerian myths, from whose mating Earth was created, so the sketch's side view shows the same as Babylon's map. Referring to the Atra-Hasis epic, Abzu is the celestial reservoir from which an organisation of younger gods triggers the Flood in order to consume humanity – also a source for the dangerous cosmic sea monster Leviathan.

Leviathan (/lɪˈvaɪ.əθən/ le-VIE-ə-thən; Hebrew: לִוְיָתָן, romanized: Livyaṯān; Greek: Λεβιάθαν) is a giant sea serpent noted in theology and mythology. It is referenced in the Hebrew Bible, as a metaphor for a powerful enemy, notably Babylon. It is referred to in Psalms, the Book of Job, the Book of Isaiah, and the Book of Enoch. Leviathan is often an embodiment of chaos, threatening to eat the damned when their lives are over. In the end, it is annihilated. Christian theologians identified Leviathan with the demon of the deadly sin envy. According to Ophite Diagrams, Leviathan encapsulates the space of the material world.

In Gnosticism, it encompasses the world like a sphere and incorporates the souls of those who are too attached to material things, so they cannot reach the realm of God's fullness beyond, from which all good emanates. In Hobbes, Leviathan becomes a metaphor for the omnipotence of the state, which maintains itself by educating children in its favour, generation after generation. This idea of eternal power that 'feeds' on its constantly self-produced citizens is based on a concept of conditioning that imprints the human's conscience in a mechanical manner. It deals in a good and evil dualism: A speculative natural law according to which man should behave towards man like a ravenous wolf, and the pedagogically transmitted laws of the state as Leviathan, whose justification for existence is seen in containing such frightening conditions.

Leviathan in the Book of Job is a reflection of the older Canaanite Lotan, a primeval monster defeated by the god Baal Hadad. Parallels to the role the primeval Sumerian sea goddess Tiamat, who was defeated by Marduk, have long been drawn in comparative mythology, as have been comparisons to dragon and world serpent narratives, such as Indra slaying Vritra or Thor slaying Jörmungandr. Some 19th century scholars pragmatically interpreted it as referring to large aquatic creatures, such as the crocodile. The word later came to be used as a term for great whale and for sea monsters in general.

== Etymology and origins ==
Gesenius (among others) argued the name לִוְיָתָן was derived from the root לוה lwh "to twine"; "to join", with an adjectival suffix ן-, for a literal meaning of "wreathed", "twisted in folds". If it exists, the adjectival suffix ן- (as opposed to -ון) is otherwise unattested except perhaps in Nehushtan, whose etymology is unknown; the ת would also require explanation, as Nechushtan is formed from neḥošeṯ and Leviathan from liveyah; the normal-pattern f.s. adjective would be לויון, liveyon. Other philologists, including Leskien, thought it a foreign loanword. A third school considers it a proper noun. Georg Lorenz Bauer proposed לוית+תן, for "wreath of serpent".

Both the name and the mythological figure are a direct continuation of the Ugaritic sea monster Lôtān, one of the servants of the sea god Yammu defeated by Hadad in the Baal Cycle. The Ugaritic account has gaps, making it unclear whether some phrases describe him or other monsters at Yammu's disposal such as Tunannu (the biblical Tannin). Most scholars agree on describing Lôtān as "the fugitive serpent" (bṯn brḥ) but he may or may not be "the wriggling serpent" (bṯn ʿqltn) or "the mighty one with seven heads" (šlyṭ d.šbʿt rašm). His role seems to have been prefigured by the earlier serpent Têmtum whose death at the hands of Hadad is depicted in Syrian seals of the 18th–16th century BC.

Sea serpents feature prominently in the mythology of the ancient Near East. They are attested by the 3rd millennium BC in Sumerian iconography depicting the god Ninurta overcoming a seven-headed serpent. It was common for Near Eastern religions to include a Chaoskampf: a cosmic battle between a sea monster representing the forces of chaos and a creator god or culture hero who imposes order by force. The Babylonian creation myth describes Marduk's defeat of the serpent goddess Tiamat, whose body was used to create the heavens and the earth. Recent scholarship has explored these sea-serpent traditions within the broader serpent symbolism of the ancient Mediterranean.

== Tanakh ==
Leviathan specifically is mentioned six times in the Tanakh.

Job 41:1–34 is dedicated to describing it in detail: "Behold, the hope of him is in vain; shall not one be cast down even at the sight of him?" Included in God's lengthy description of his indomitable creation is Leviathan's fire-breathing ability, his impenetrable scales, and his overall indomitability in Job 41. In Psalm 104, God is praised for having made all things, including Leviathan, and in Isaiah 27:1, he is called the "tortuous serpent" who will be killed at the end of time.

The mention of the Tannins in the Genesis creation narrative (translated as "great whales" in the King James Version), in Job, and in the Psalm do not describe them as harmful but as ocean creatures who are part of God's creation. The element of competition between God and the sea monster and the use of Leviathan to describe the powerful enemies of Israel may reflect the influence of the Mesopotamian and Canaanite legends or the contest in Egyptian mythology between the Apep snake and the sun god Ra. Alternatively, the removal of such competition may have reflected an attempt to naturalize Leviathan in a process that demoted it from deity to demon to monster.

== Judaism ==
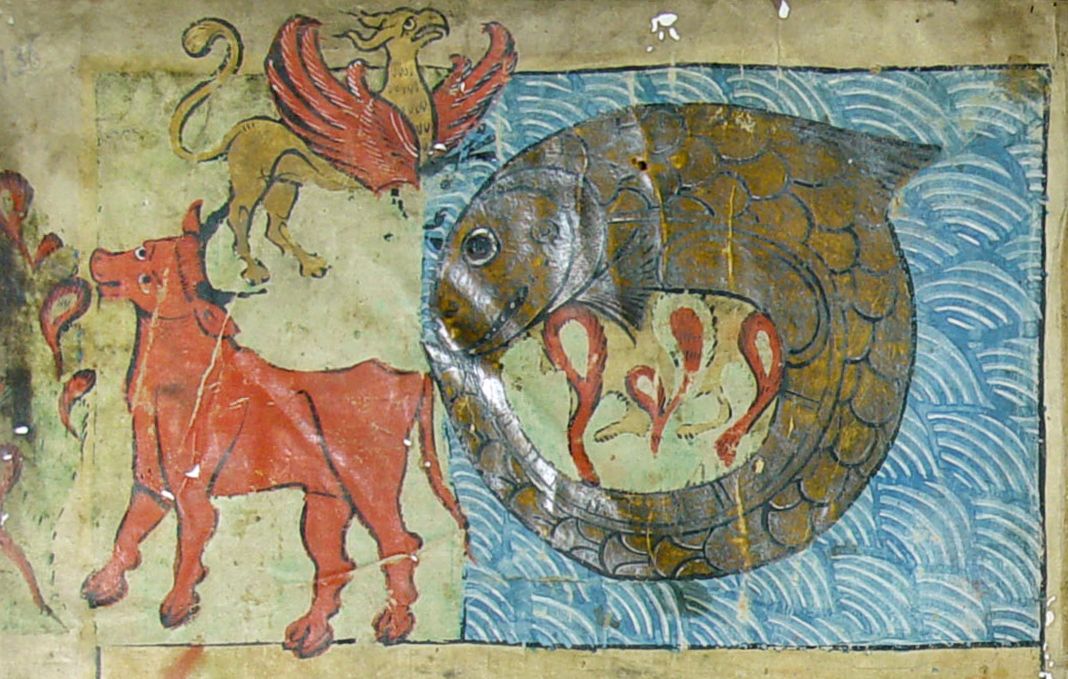
Leviathan the sea-monster, with Behemoth the land-monster and Ziz the air-monster. "And on that day were two monsters parted, a female monster named Leviathan, to dwell in the abysses of the ocean over the fountains of the waters. But the male is named Behemoth, who occupied with his breast a waste wilderness named Duidain." (1 Enoch 60:7–8)

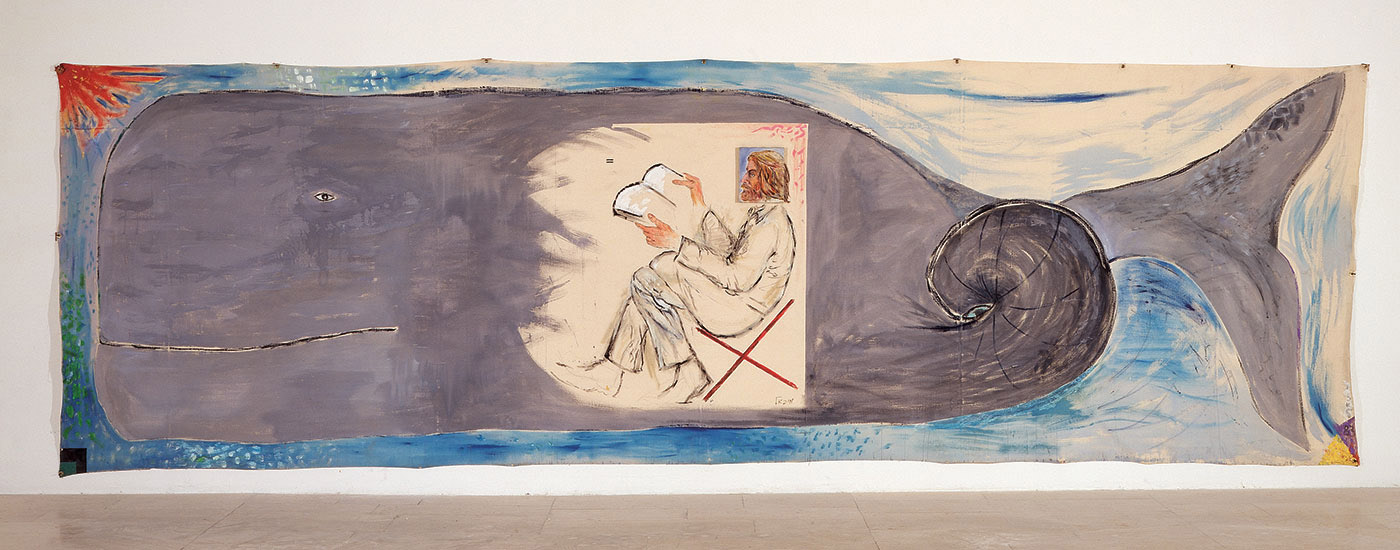
Leviathan (1983), a painting by Michael Sgan-Cohen, the Israel Museum Collection, Jerusalem

Later Jewish sources describe Leviathan as a dragon who lives over the sources of the deep and who, along with the male land-monster Behemoth, will be served up to the righteous at the end of time. The Book of Enoch (60:7–9) describes Leviathan as a female monster dwelling in the watery abyss (as Tiamat), while Behemoth is a male monster living in the desert of Dunaydin ("east of Eden").

In the Jewish midrash (explanations of the Tanakh), it is stated that God originally produced a male and a female leviathan, but lest in multiplying the species should destroy the world, he slew the female, reserving her flesh for the banquet that will be given to the righteous on the advent of the Messiah. A similar description appears in Book of Enoch (60:24), which describes how the Behemoth and Leviathan will be prepared as part of an eschatological meal.

Rashi's commentary on Genesis 1:21 repeats the tradition:

the ... sea monsters: The great fish in the sea, and in the words of the Aggadah (B.B. 74b), this refers to the Leviathan and its mate, for He created them male and female, and He slew the female and salted her away for the righteous in the future, for if they would propagate, the world could not exist because of them. הַתַּנִינִם is written. (Note: The "הַתַּנִינִם is written" reference is to a missing final letter 'י' ("yud"), which would denote a plural, if used. Rashi uses this to infer that the leviathans did not remain two, but were reduced to just one leviathan, hence Hebrew grammatical singular spelling.)

In the Talmud Baba Bathra 75 it is told that Leviathan will be slain and its flesh served as a feast to the righteous in [the] "time to come" and its skin used to cover the tent where the banquet will take place. Those who do not deserve to consume its flesh beneath the tent may receive various vestments of Leviathan varying from coverings (for the somewhat deserving) to amulets (for the least deserving). The remaining skin of Leviathan will be spread onto the walls of Jerusalem, thereby illuminating the world with its brightness. The festival of Sukkot (Festival of Booths) therefore concludes with a prayer recited upon leaving the sukkah (booth):

"May it be your will, Lord our God and God of our forefathers, that just as I have fulfilled and dwelt in this sukkah, so may I merit in the coming year to dwell in the sukkah of the skin of Leviathan. Next year in Jerusalem."

The enormous size of Leviathan is described by Johanan bar Nappaha, from whom proceeded nearly all the aggadot concerning this monster:

"Once we went in a ship and saw a fish which put his head out of the water. He had horns upon which was written: 'I am one of the meanest creatures that inhabit the sea. I am three hundred miles in length, and enter this day into the jaws of the Leviathan'".

When Leviathan is hungry, reports Rabbi Dimi in the name of Rabbi Johanan, he sends forth from his mouth a heat so great as to make all the waters of the deep boil, and if he would put his head into Paradise no living creature could endure the odor of him. His abode is the Mediterranean Sea.

In a legend recorded in the midrash called Pirke de-Rabbi Eliezer it is stated that the fish which swallowed Jonah narrowly avoided being eaten by Leviathan, which eats one whale each day. (Note: The dragon is often represented in the act of partially wrapping itself on itself, with an apparent link with the commonly known snake; the combination of the dragon with the orbits of the constellations is evident, it also represents the incorruptible laws of creation and in this case the laws of the stars, as mentioned in the Book of Psalms and in particular in the kiddush levana, thereby indicating the ethical balance of who, being tzadik, would never allow himself to be tempted by sin. The correlation with the fish Leviathan, as mentioned, thus concerns the attempt not to let oneself "be submerged by the sins of the world", so much so that in the same Pirkei Avot it is explicitly taught that God has mercy on His creatures and on Creation when the merits in the World exceed in quantity the sins of men. Thus the principle of stability in the world together with "detachment from sin", while balanced by involvement in the good things that it presents to us, is sanctioned with what God says to King David, warning him about "the fundamental stone of the world in correspondence with Jerusalem": It is explained that God tells King David not to insist ... because "otherwise the fundamental stone would have risen to the surface ... and the waters would have invaded the world again ...". This is precisely the messianic struggle already prophesied about Leviathan.)

The body of Leviathan, especially his eyes, possesses great illuminating power. This was the opinion of Rabbi Eliezer, who, in the course of a voyage in company with Rabbi Joshua, explained to the latter, when frightened by the sudden appearance of a brilliant light, that it probably proceeded from the eyes of Leviathan. He referred his companion to the words of Job 41:18:

"By his neesings a light doth shine, and his eyes are like the eyelids of the morning".

However, in spite of his supernatural strength, Leviathan is afraid of a small worm called "kilbit", which clings to the gills of large fish and kills them.

In the eleventh-century piyyut (religious poem), Akdamut, recited on Shavuot (Pentecost), it is envisioned that, ultimately, God will slaughter Leviathan, which is described as having "mighty fins" (and, therefore, a kosher fish, not an inedible snake or crocodile), and it will be served as a sumptuous banquet for all the righteous in heaven.

In the Zohar, Leviathan is a metaphor for enlightenment. The Zohar remarks that the legend of the righteous eating the flesh of Leviathan at the end of the days is not literal, and merely a metaphor for enlightenment. The Zohar also specifies in detail that the Leviathan has a mate. The Zohar also associates the metaphor of the leviathan with the "tzaddik" or righteous in Zohar 2:11b and 3:58a. The Zohar associates it with the "briach" the pole in the middle of the boards of the tabernacle in Zohar 2:20a. Both, are associated with the Sefira of Yesod.

According to Abraham Isaac Kook, Leviathan – a singular creature with no mate, "its tail is placed in its mouth" (Zohar) "twisting around and encompassing the entire world" (Rashi on Baba Batra 74b) – projects a vivid metaphor for the universe's underlying unity. This unity will only be revealed in the future, when the righteous will feast on Leviathan.

== Christianity ==
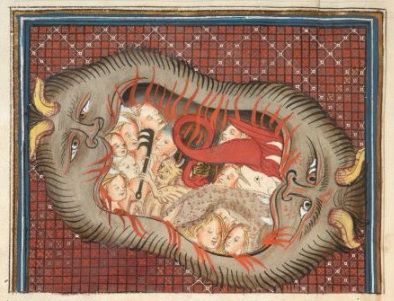
Hellmouth The life of St John and Apocalypse, c. 1400

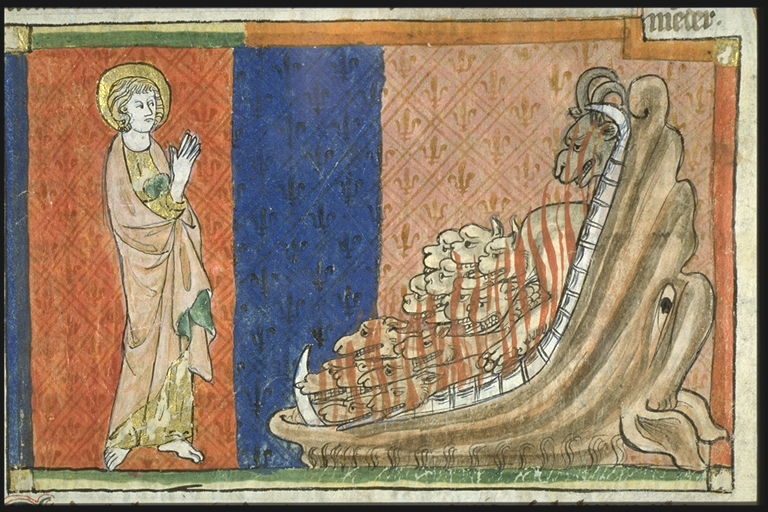
Saint John sees the devil, vanquished forever, cast into hell with the Beast and the False Prophet

Leviathan can also be used as an image of the devil, endangering both God's creatures — by attempting to eat them — and God's creation — by threatening it with upheaval in the waters of chaos. A "dragon" (drakon), being the usual translation for the leviathan in the Septuagint, appears in the Book of Revelation. Although the Old Testament nowhere identifies the leviathan with the devil, the seven-headed dragon in the Book of Revelation explicitly is. By this the battle between God and the primordial chaos monsters shifts to a battle between God and the devil. Only once, in the Book of Job, the leviathan is translated as "sea-monster" (κῆτος, ketos).

In the following chapter, a seven-headed beast, described with the same features as the dragon before, rises from the waters endowing a Beast of the Earth with power. Dividing the beasts into monster of water and one of dry earth is probably a recalling of the monstrous pair Leviathan and Behemoth. In accordance with Isaiah 27:1, the dragon will be slain by God on the last day and cast into the abyss. The annihilation of the chaos-monster results in a new world of peace, without any trace of evil.

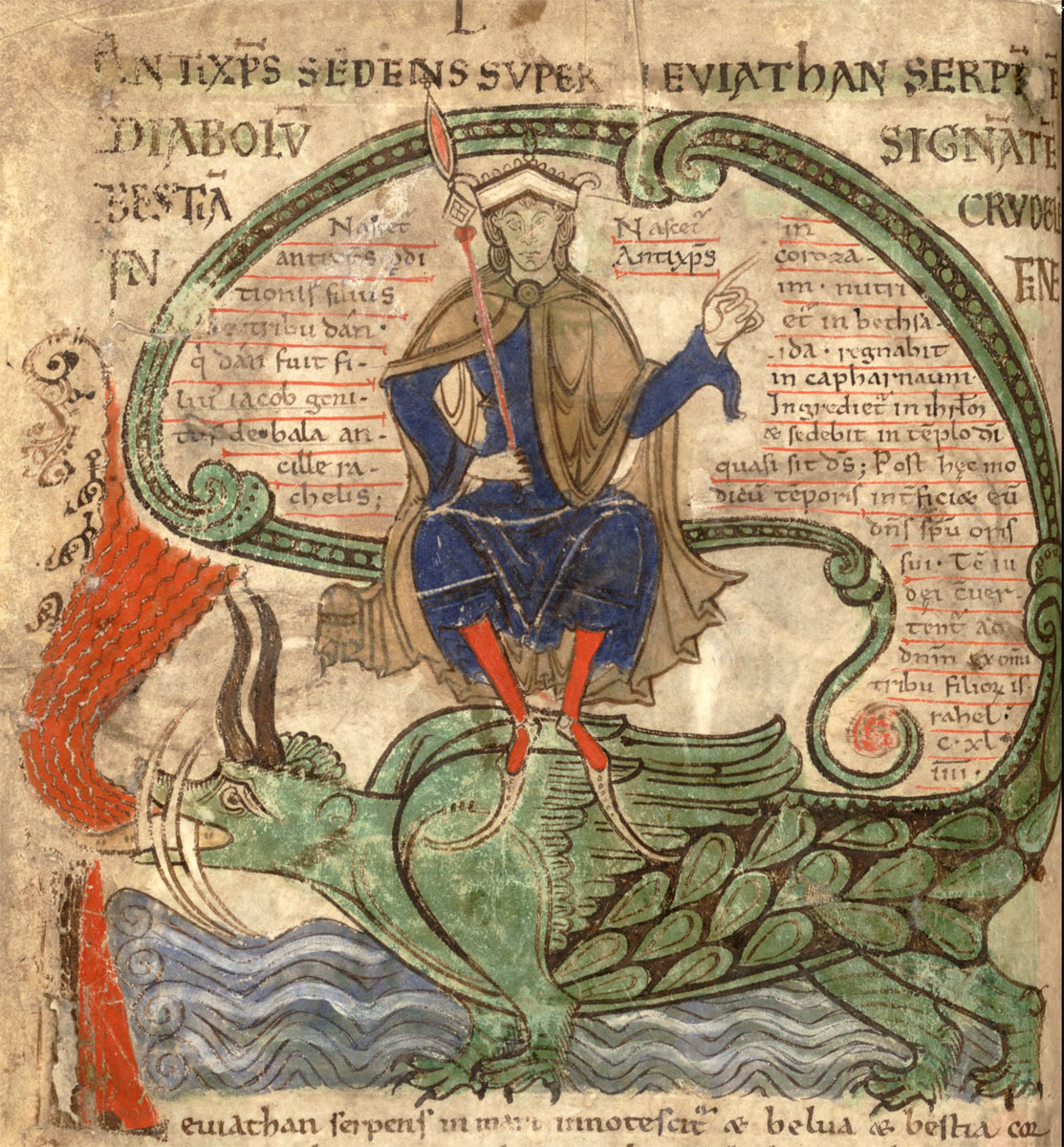
Antichrist on Leviathan, Liber floridus, 1120

Jerome comments on Psalm 104:26 that "this is the dragon that was cast out of Paradise, that beguiled Eve, and is permitted in this world to make sport of us. How many monks and clerics has it dashed headlong! "They all look to you to give them food in due time," for all the creatures of God live at His bidding."

Peter Binsfeld classified Leviathan as the demon of envy, as one of the seven Princes of Hell corresponding to the seven deadly sins. Leviathan became associated with, and may originally have been referred to by, the visual motif of the Hellmouth, a monstrous animal into whose mouth the damned disappear at the Last Judgment, found in Anglo-Saxon art from about 800, and later all over Europe.

The Revised Standard Version of the Bible suggests in a footnote to Job 41:1 that Leviathan may be a name for the crocodile, and in a footnote to Job 40:15, that Behemoth may be a name for the hippopotamus.

== Satanism ==
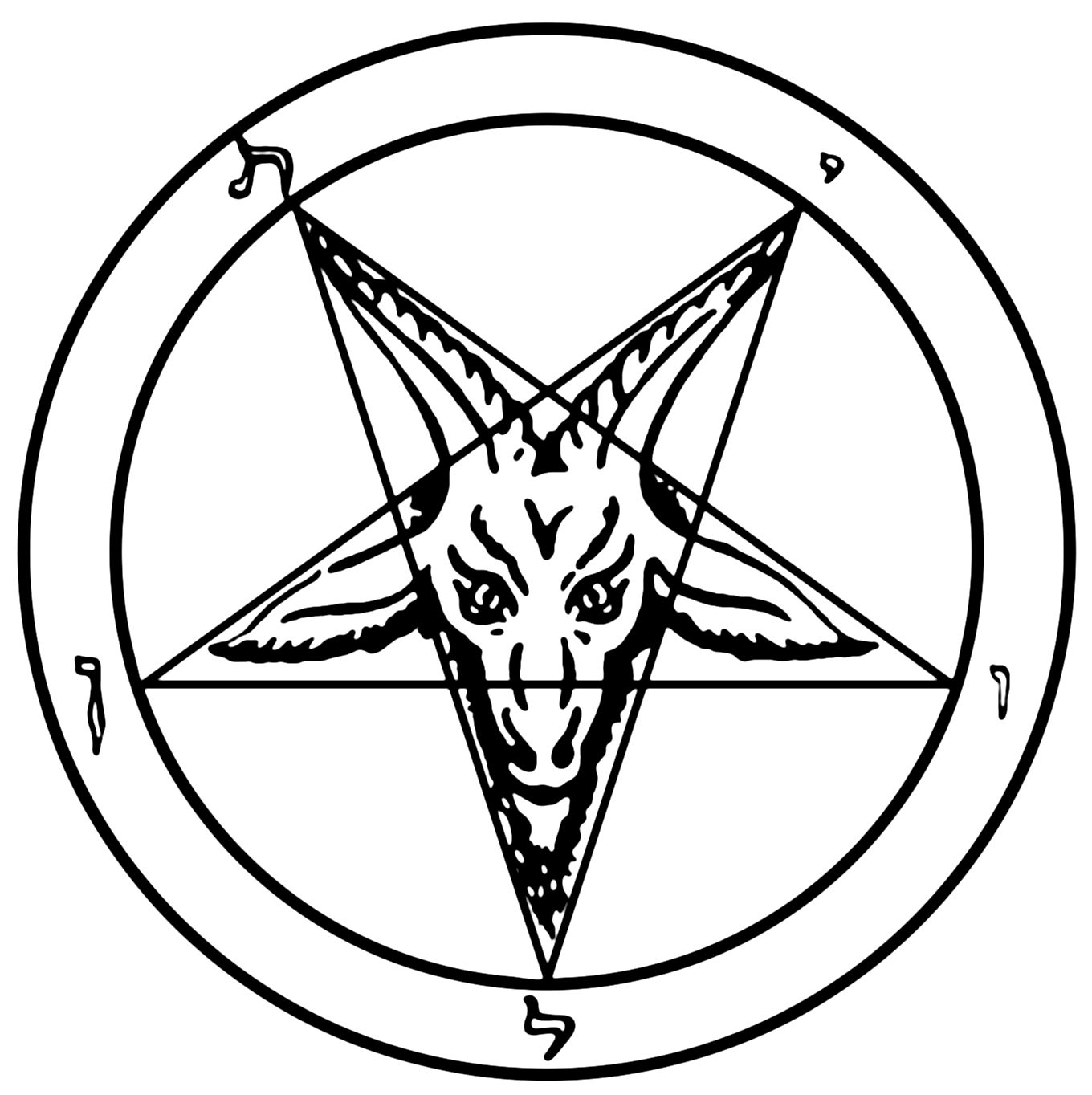
The Sigil of Baphomet, which features the Hebrew name for Leviathan, לויתן

Anton LaVey in The Satanic Bible (1969) has Leviathan representing the element of water and the direction of west, listing it as one of the Four Crown Princes of Hell. This association was inspired by the demonic hierarchy from The Book of the Sacred Magic of Abra-Melin the Mage. The Church of Satan uses the Hebrew letters at each of the points of the sigil of Baphomet to represent Leviathan. Starting from the lowest point of the pentagram, and reading counter-clockwise, the word reads "לויתן": (Nun, Tav, Yod, Vav, Lamed) Hebrew for "Leviathan".

== Gnosticism ==
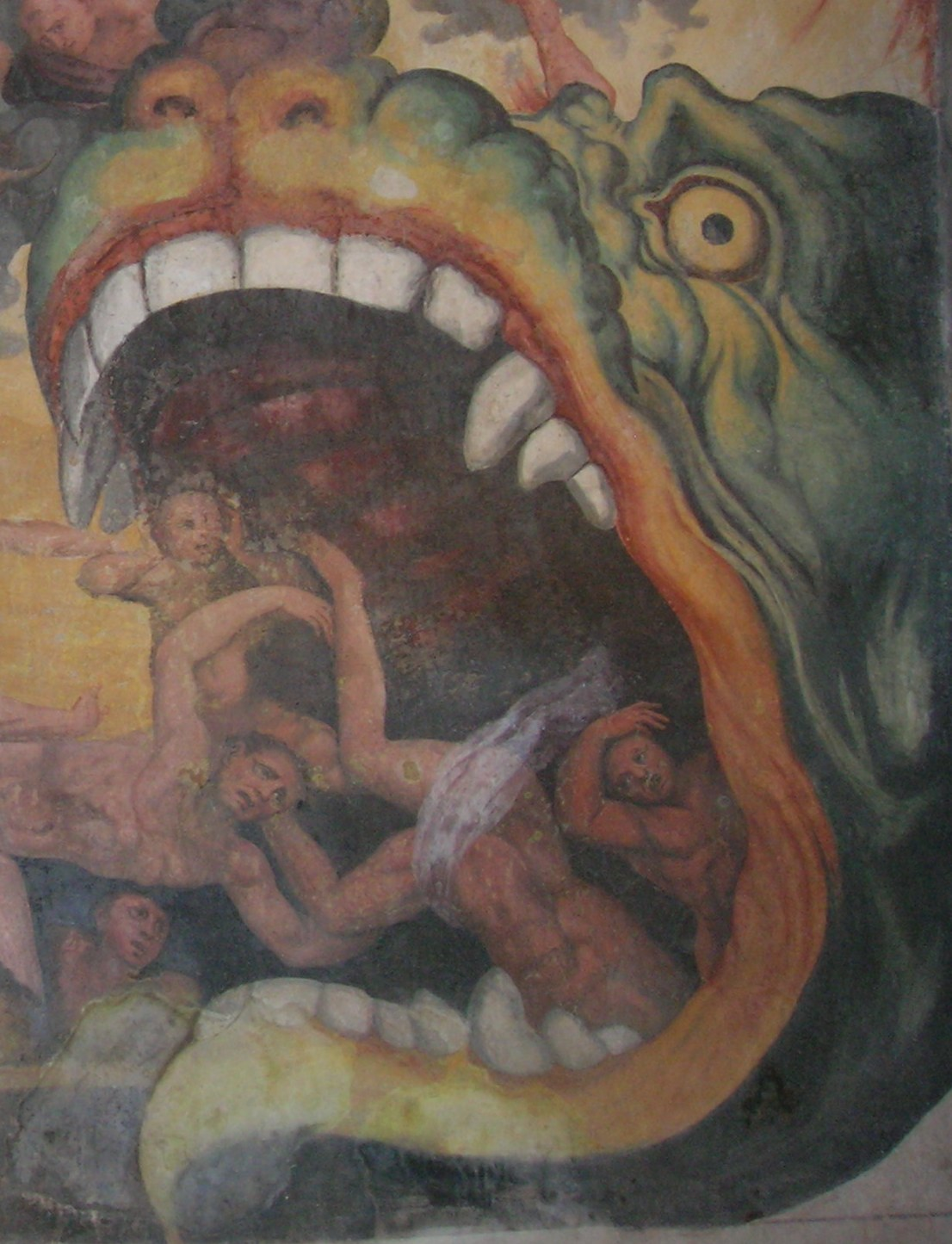
Hellmouth in the fresco Last Judgment, by Giacomo Rossignolo, c. 1555

The Church Father Origen accused a Gnostic sect of venerating the biblical serpent of the Garden of Eden. Therefore, he calls them Ophites, naming after the serpent they are supposed to worship. In this belief system, the Leviathan appears as an Ouroboros, separating the divine realm from humanity by enveloping or permeating the material world. It is unknown whether or not the Ophites actually identified the serpent of the Garden of Eden with Leviathan. However, since Leviathan is basically connoted negatively in this Gnostic cosmology, if they identified him with the serpent of the Book of Genesis, he was probably indeed considered evil and just its advice was good.

According to the cosmology of this Gnostic sect, the world is encapsulated by Leviathan, in form of a dragon-shaped archon, biting its own tail (ouroboros). Generating the intrinsic evil in the entire universe, the Leviathan separates the lower world, governed by the Archons, from the realm of God. After death, a soul must pass through the seven spheres of the heavens. If the soul does not succeed, it will be swallowed by the Leviathan, who holds the world captive and returns the soul into an animal body.

In Mandaeism, Leviathan is regarded as being coessential with a demon called Ur.

In Manichaeism, an ancient religion influenced by Gnostic ideas, Leviathan is killed by the sons of the fallen angel Shemyaza. This act is not portrayed as heroic, but as foolish, symbolizing the greatest triumphs as transient, since both are killed by archangels in turn after boasting about their victory. This reflects Manichaean criticism on royal power and advocates asceticism.

== Secular use ==
The word "leviathan" has come to refer to any sea monster, and from the early 17th century has also been used to refer to overwhelmingly powerful people or things, comparable to Behemoth, also a biblical term as noted by Hobbes' book (1651).

As a term for sea monster, it has also been used of great whales in particular, e.g. in Herman Melville's Moby-Dick – although in the first Hebrew translation of the novel, translator Elyahu Burtinker chose to translate "whale" to "tanin" (intending to refer to another sea monster although in modern Hebrew usage tanin more commonly translates to "crocodile"), and leave the word "leviathan" as it is, nodding to the ambiguity of the word "לויתן" in modern Hebrew – in which the word now simply means "whale".

An extinct genus of sperm whales bears the name Livyatan. A major cryovolcanic feature on Neptune's largest moon Triton has been named Leviathan Patera.

== See also ==
- Aspidochelone
- Apalala
- Bahamut (Note: The name Bahamut is thought to derive from the biblical Behemoth.)
- Bakunawa
- Book of Job in Byzantine illuminated manuscripts
- Cetus (mythology)
- Devil Whale
- Falak (Arabian legend)
- Ikuchi
- Jörmungandr
- Ladon (mythology)
- Gaasyendietha
- Nyami Nyami
- Imugi
- Sisiutl
- Tiamat
- Ouroboros
- Rahab (mythology)

== Cited sources ==
- Heider, George C. (1999). "Tannîn". Dictionary of Deities and Demons in the Bible (2nd ed.). Grand Rapids: Wm. B. Eerdmans Publishing. pp. 834–836. ISBN 9780802824912.
- Herrmann, Wolfgang (1999). "Baal". Dictionary of Deities and Demons in the Bible (2nd ed.). Grand Rapids: Wm. B. Eerdmans Publishing. pp. 132–139. ISBN 9780802824912.
- Uehlinger, C. (1999). "Leviathan". Dictionary of Deities and Demons in the Bible (2nd ed.). Grand Rapids: Wm. B. Eerdmans Publishing. pp. 511–515. ISBN 9780802824912.
