= Behemoth =

Biblical creature

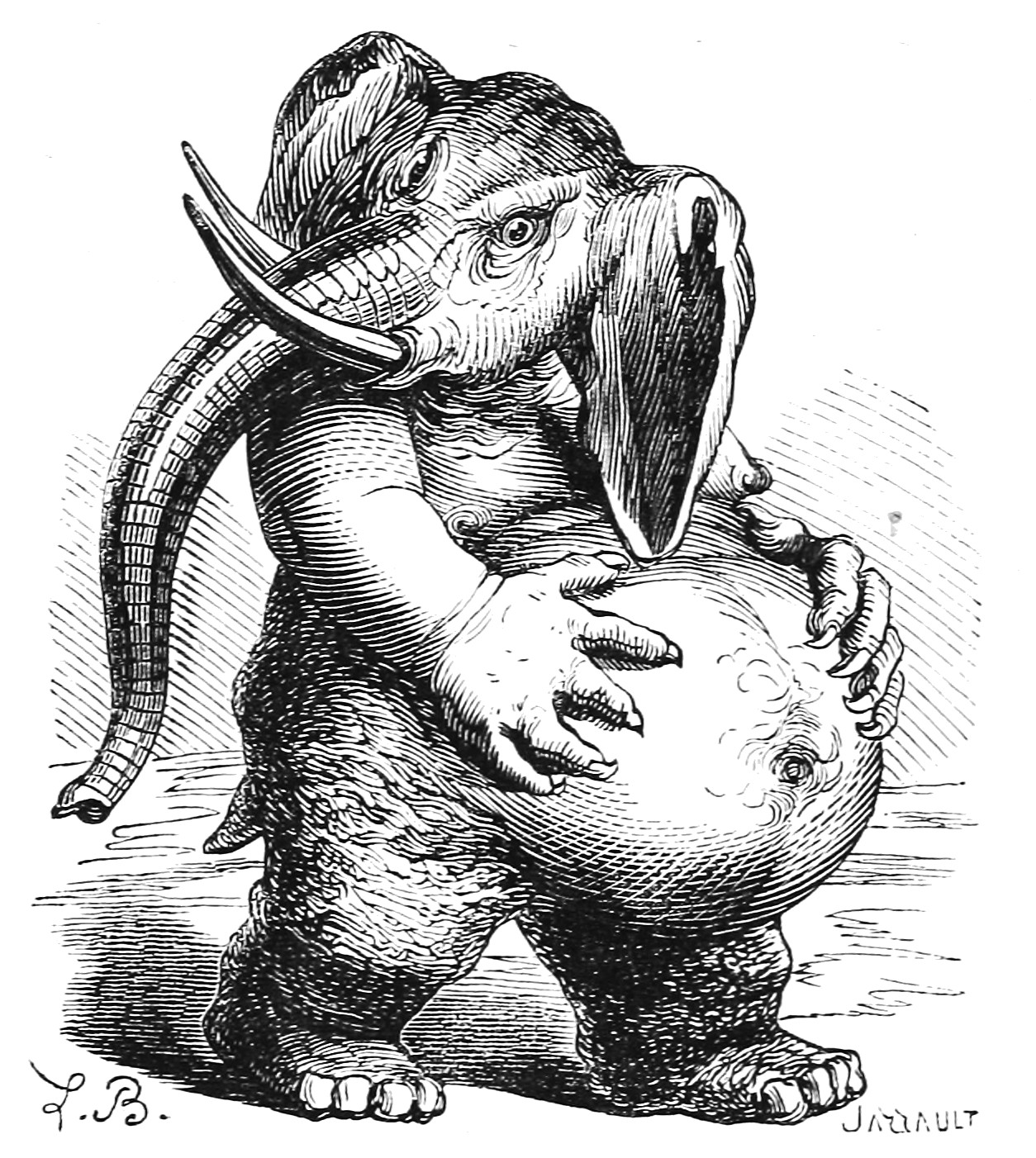
Behemoth as depicted in the Dictionnaire Infernal by Collin de Plancy

Behemoth (/bɪˈhiːməθ, ˈbiːə-/; Hebrew: בְּהֵמוֹת, bəhēmōṯ) is a beast from the biblical Book of Job, and is an echo of the primeval chaos-monsters created by God. Metaphorically, the name has come to be used for any extremely large or powerful entity.

== Etymology ==
The Hebrew word behemoth (Biblical Hebrew: בְ֭הֵמוֹת, romanized: bəhēmoṯ) has the same form as the plural of Biblical Hebrew: בְּהֵמָה, romanized: bəhēmā, lit. 'beast', suggesting an augmentative form meaning "great beast". Despite its plural form, it takes singulative adjectives, much like other pluralised augmentative forms such as Elohim "God".

Some theorize that the word might originate from an Egyptian word of the form pꜣ jḥ mw "the water-ox", meaning "hippopotamus", altered by folk etymology in Hebrew to resemble bəhēmā. However, this phrase with this meaning is unattested at any stage of Egyptian. Even before the decipherment of Ancient Egyptian in the early 19th century, there was widespread identification of the biblical behemoth with the hippopotamus. The word for "hippopotamus" in Russian remains derivative of behemoth (бегемот), a meaning that entered the language in the mid-18th century.

== Biblical description ==
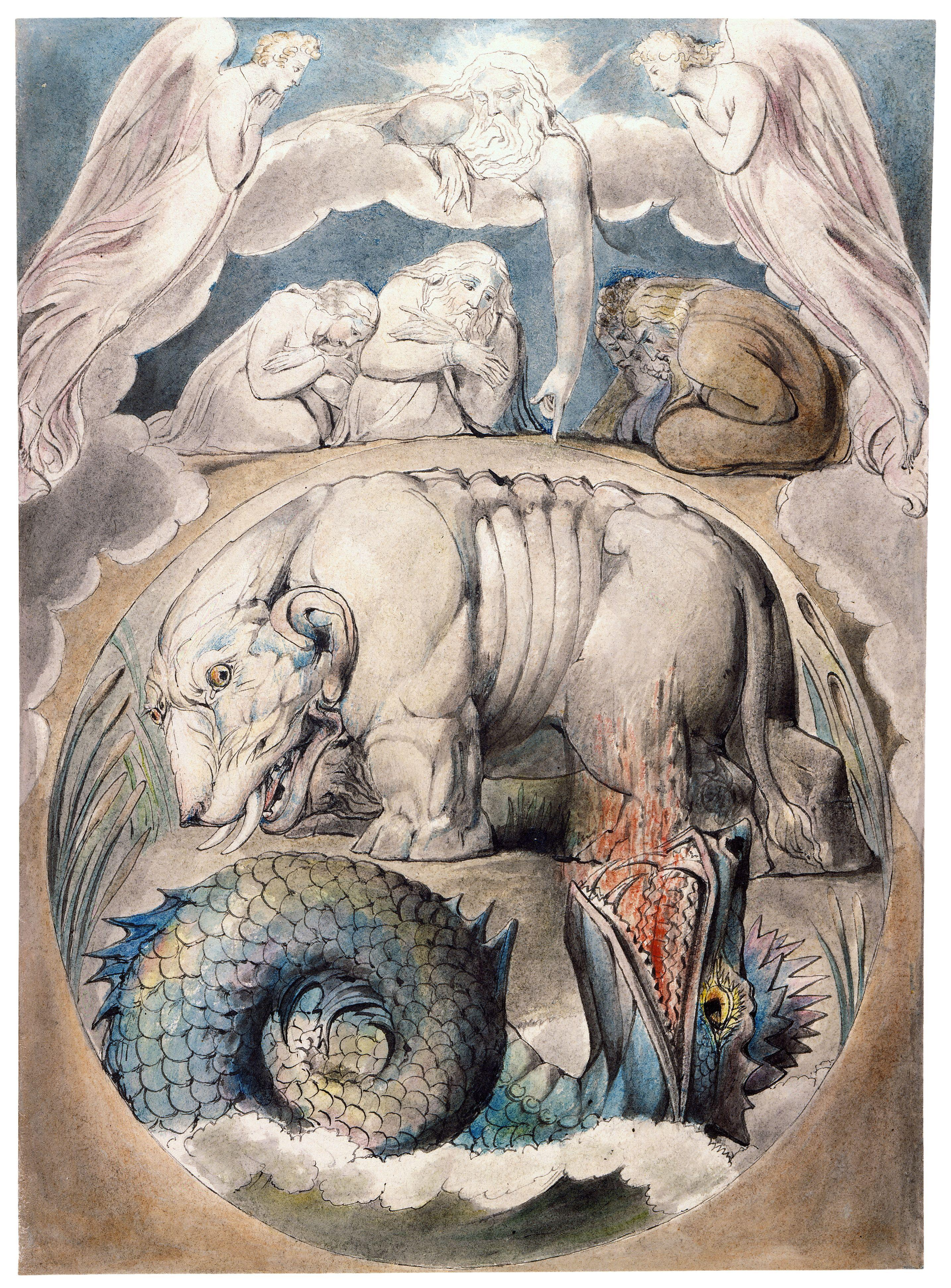
Behemoth and Leviathan, watercolour by William Blake from his Illustrations of the Book of Job (1805).

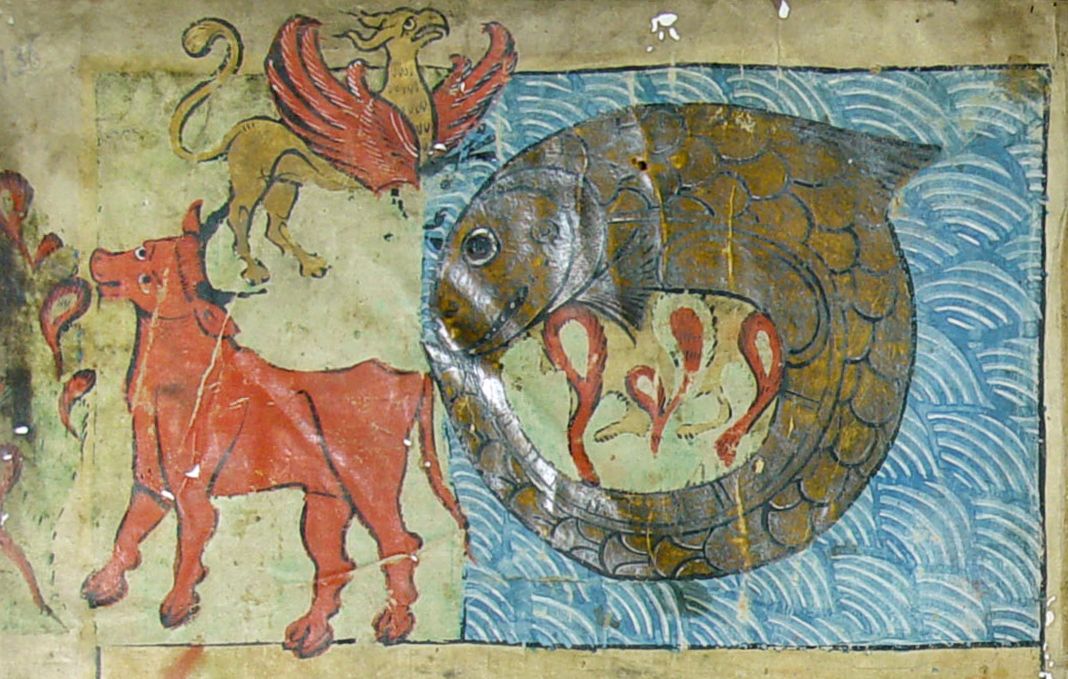
Leviathan the sea-monster, with Behemoth the land-monster and Ziz the air-monster. "And on that day were two monsters parted, a female monster named Leviathan, to dwell in the abysses of the ocean over the fountains of the waters. But the male is named Behemoth, who occupied with his breast a waste wilderness named Duidain." (1 Enoch 60:7–8)

The Hebrew word behemoth is mentioned only once in Biblical text, in a speech from the mouth of God in the Book of Job. It is a primeval creature created by God and so powerful that only God can overcome him:

Take now behemoth, whom I made as I did you;
He eats grass, like the cattle.
His strength is in his loins,
His might in the muscles of his belly.
He makes his tail stand up like a cedar;
The sinews of his thighs are knit together.
His bones are like tubes of bronze,
His limbs like iron rods.
He is the first of God’s works;
Only his Maker can draw the sword against him.
The mountains yield him produce,
Where all the beasts of the field play.
He lies down beneath the lotuses,
In the cover of the swamp reeds.
The lotuses embower him with shade;
The willows of the brook surround him.
He can restrain the river from its rushing;
He is confident the stream will gush at his command.
Can he be taken by his eyes?
Can his nose be pierced by hooks?

— Job 40:15–24

The passage later pairs Behemoth with the sea-monster Leviathan, both composite mythical creatures with enormous strength that humans could not hope to control, yet both are reduced to the status of divine pets.

== Later interpretations ==
In Jewish apocrypha and pseudepigrapha, such as the 2nd century BC Book of Enoch (60:7–10), Behemoth is the unconquerable male land-monster living in Duidain, an invisible desert east of the Garden of Eden, Leviathan is the primeval female sea-monster, dwelling in the Abyss, and Ziz is the primordial sky-monster.

Similarly, in the most ancient section of Second Esdras 6:47–52, written around the 1st century, after the destruction of the Second Temple, the two are described as inhabiting the mountains and the seas, respectively, after being separated from each other, due to the sea's insufficiency to contain them both. Likewise, in the contemporaneous 2 Baruch 29:4, it is stated that Behemoth will come forth from his seclusion on land, and Leviathan out of the sea, and that the two gigantic monsters, created on the fifth day, will serve as food for the elect, who will survive in the days of the Messiah.

A Jewish rabbinic legend describes a great battle that will take place between them at the end of time: "they will interlock with one another and engage in combat, with his horns the Behemoth will gore with strength, the fish [Leviathan] will leap to meet him with his fins, with power. Their Creator will approach them with his mighty sword [and slay them both];" then, "from the beautiful skin of the Leviathan, God will construct canopies to shelter the righteous, who will eat the meat of the Behemoth and the Leviathan amid great joy and merriment." In the Haggadah, Behemoth's strength reaches its peak on the summer solstice of every solar year (around 21 June). At this time of year, Behemoth lets out a loud roar that makes all animals tremble with fear and thus renders them less ferocious for a whole year. As a result, weak animals live in safety away from the reach of wild animals. This mythical phenomenon is shown as an example of divine mercy and goodness. Without Behemoth's roar, traditions say, animals would grow wilder and more ferocious and would go around butchering each other and humans.

Modern interpretations of Behemoth tend to fall into several categories:

1. Behemoth is an animal of the modern natural world, most often the hippopotamus (e.g. in Russian, where the word begemot refers more often to hippopotamus rather than the Biblical animal), although the elephant and water buffalo could also be candidates. All three consume grass and chew it as an ox would, and the elephant and water buffalo both have mobile, sprucy tails that sway in a similar manner to a cedar.
2. Behemoth was an invention of the poet who wrote the Book of Job.
3. Behemoth and Leviathan were both separate mythical chaos-beasts.
4. Additionally, some Young Earth creationists, such as the Christian fundamentalist organization Answers in Genesis, claim that Behemoth is some species of sauropod or other dinosaur based on the comparison of the tail with a Western redcedar in Job 40:17.

== Literary references ==
The 17th-century political philosopher Thomas Hobbes named the Long Parliament 'Behemoth' in his book Behemoth. It accompanies his book of political theory that draws on the lessons of English Civil War, the rather more famous Leviathan.

The Dictionnaire Infernal version of Behemoth is a demon that resembles a round-bellied humanoid elephant. He works as the infernal watchman for Satan and oversees the banquets in Hell while having a good singing voice.

The Behemoth is also mentioned in the opera, Nixon in China, composed by John Adams, and written by Alice Goodman. At the beginning of the first act, the chorus sings "The people are the heroes now, Behemoth pulls the peasants' plow" several times.

The Russian writer Mikhail Bulgakov used a demonic cat with the name Behemoth as a character in his novel The Master and Margarita. In the book the cat could speak and walk on two legs and was part of the entourage of Woland, who represented Satan.

The webnovel Worm features the Endbringers, a trio of city-destroying monsters named Behemoth, Leviathan and the Simurgh.

== See also ==
- Bamot – 1st-millennium BCE Canaanite shrine
- Bahamut – Mythical sea monster
- Senegal River, anciently called the Bambotus
- The Beast (Revelation) – two beasts described in the New Testament
- Beast of the Earth – Sign of the Endtimes in Islamic apocalyptic
- Book of Job in Byzantine illuminated manuscripts
- The Giant Behemoth – 1959 American-British science fiction giant monster film by Eugène Lourié
- Kujata – Cosmic bull in medieval Islam
- Tarasque – Creature from French mythology
- Hadhayosh – Land creature from ancient Persian mythology
- Behemoth – 2010 novel by Scott Westerfeld
- World Elephant – Eight legendary elephants of Hinduism
- World Turtle – Giant turtle supporting or containing the world
- Chaoskampf – Mythological combat motif
