= Land of Nod =

Place mentioned in the Bible, the abode of Cain

The Land of Nod (Hebrew: אֶרֶץ־נוֹד – ʾereṣ-Nōḏ) is a place mentioned in the Book of Genesis of the Hebrew Bible, located "on the east of Eden" (qiḏmaṯ-ʿḖḏen), where Cain was exiled by God after Cain had murdered his brother Abel.

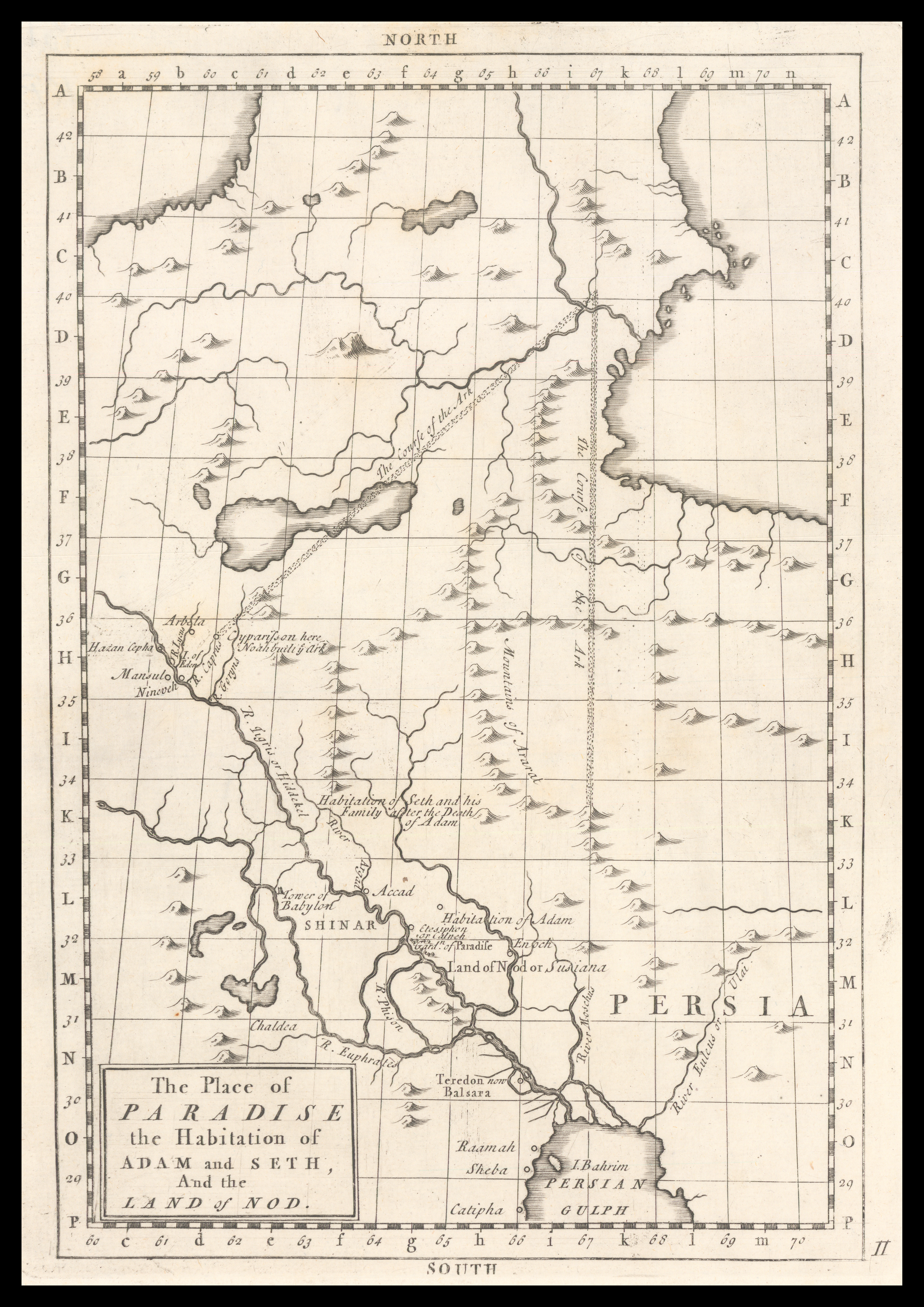
Map by Thomas Stackhouse showing postulated locations for Adamic locations, including the Land of Nod (south central part of map, identified with Susiana).

According to Genesis 4:16:

And Cain went out from the presence of the LORD, and dwelt in the land of Nod, on the east of Eden.
וַיֵּ֥צֵא קַ֖יִן מִלִּפְנֵ֣י יְהוָ֑ה וַיֵּ֥שֶׁב בְּאֶֽרֶץ־נֹ֖וד קִדְמַת־עֵֽדֶן׃

Genesis 4:17 relates that after arriving in the Land of Nod, Cain's wife had a son with him, Enoch, in whose name he built the first city.

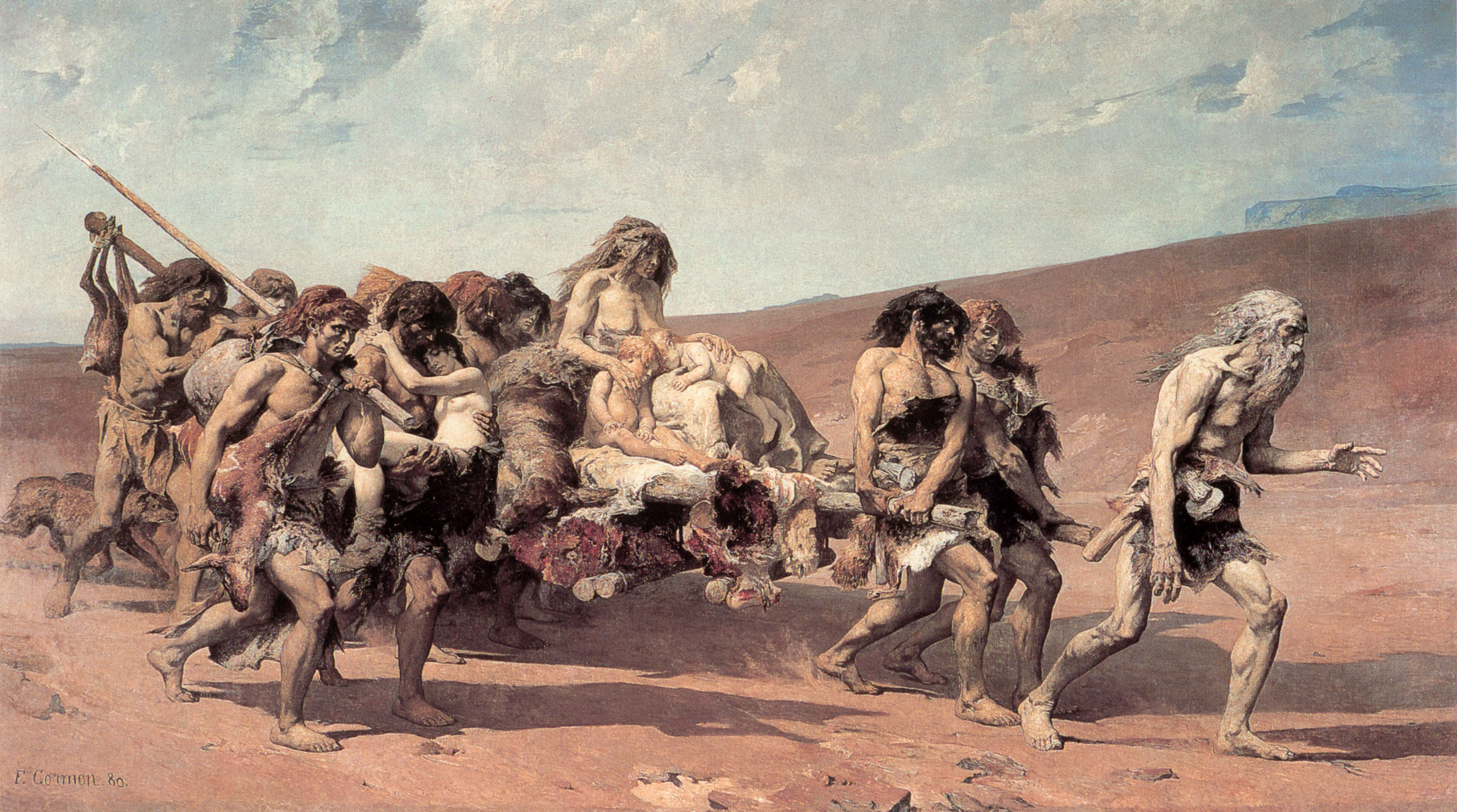
Cain fleeing before Jehovah's Curse, by Fernand-Anne Piestre Cormon, c. 1880

== Name ==
"Nod" (נוד) is the Hebrew root of the verb "to wander" (לנדוד). Therefore, to dwell in the land of Nod can mean to live a wandering life. Gesenius defines (נוּד) as follows:

TO BE MOVED, TO BE AGITATED (Arab. ناد Med. Waw id.), used of a reed shaken by the wind, 1Ki.14:15; hence to wander, to be a fugitive, Jer. 4:1; Gen. 4:12, 14; Ps.56:9; to flee, Ps. 11:1; Jer. 49:30. Figuratively, Isa. 17:11, נֵד קָצִיר "the harvest has fled" ["but see נֵד ," which some take in this place as the subst (substitute).].

Much as Cain's name is connected to the verb meaning "to get" in Genesis 4:1, the name "Nod" closely resembles the word "nad" (נָד), usually translated as "vagabond", in Genesis 4:12. (In the Septuagint's rendering of the same verse God curses Cain to τρέμων (tremōn), "trembling".)

A Greek version of Nod written as Ναίν (Nain) appearing in the Onomastica Vaticana possibly derives from the plural נחים (naḥim), which relates to resting and sleeping. This derivation, coincidentally or not, connects with the English pun on "nod".

== Interpretation ==
Josephus wrote in Antiquities of the Jews (c. AD 93) that Cain continued his wickedness in Nod: resorting to violence and robbery; establishing weights and measures; transforming human culture from innocence into craftiness and deceit; establishing property lines; and building a fortified city.

Nod is said to be outside of the presence or face of God. Origen defined Nod as the land of trembling and wrote that it symbolized the condition of all who forsake God. Early commentators treated it as the opposite of Eden (worse still than the land of exile for the rest of humanity). In the English tradition Nod was sometimes described as a desert inhabited only by ferocious beasts or monsters. Others interpreted Nod as dark or even underground—away from the face of God.

Augustine described unconverted Jews as dwellers in the land of Nod, which he defined as commotion and "carnal disquietude".

== Places named "Land of Nod" ==
=== U.K. ===
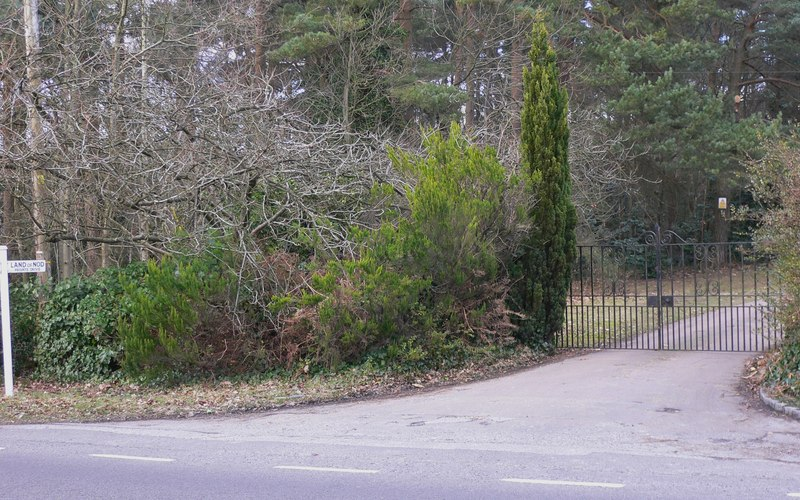
Gate to Land of Nod Road in Headley Down, Hampshire, UK

Land of Nod is the name of a hamlet in the East Riding of Yorkshire, England. It is located at the far end of a two-mile-long (3.2 km) road, which joins the A614 road at Holme-on-Spalding-Moor (53.8185°N 0.7215°W).

It is the name of a private road in Headley Down, Hampshire, UK (51.1211°N 0.7998°W).

=== U.S. ===
The name "Land of Nod" was accorded locally to the northerly 3,000 acres (1,214.1 hectares) of the Great Plot lying north of Woburn, Massachusetts, at its foundation in 1640–42, "the name being probably suggested by a comparison of its forlorn condition — so far remote from church ordinances — with the Nod to which Cain wandered when he went 'from the presence of the Lord'." Its Native American name was Nena Saawaattawattocks.

Land of Nod Road is the name of a residential road in Windham, Maine, US (43.7506°N 70.3787°W).

== In popular culture ==
The Land of Nod can refer to the mythical land of sleep, a pun on Land of Nod (Gen. 4:16). To "go off to the land of Nod" plays with the phrase to "nod off", meaning to go to sleep.

The first recorded use of the phrase to mean "sleep" comes from Jonathan Swift in his Complete Collection of Genteel and Ingenious Conversation (1737) and Gulliver's Travels.

Later instances of this usage appear: in "Brother Rabbit and His Famous Foot" (story #30 in Joel Chandler Harris' Nights with Uncle Remus 1883 collection), in which the narrator says that the old African teller Daddy Jack, having just fallen asleep, has reached the land of Nod; in the poem "The Land of Nod" by Robert Louis Stevenson from the A Child's Garden of Verses (1885) collection.

In Henry Miller's World of Sex, Miller claims that people behave like automatons, in the "[L]and of nod, with everyone spinning like tops."

In the Arc of a Scythe series (c. 2016) by Neal Shusterman, the Land of Nod is mythologized as containing a mythical fail-safe against the Scythedom and becomes critically important to the plot of the third book.

In the Command & Conquer (c. 1995) series, one of the two warring factions is named the Brotherhood of Nod, who are led by and devoted to a mysterious and charismatic figure named Kane.

== See also ==
- Duidain, a wilderness to the east of the Garden of Eden in the Book of Enoch
