= Bar yokni =

Jewish legendary bird

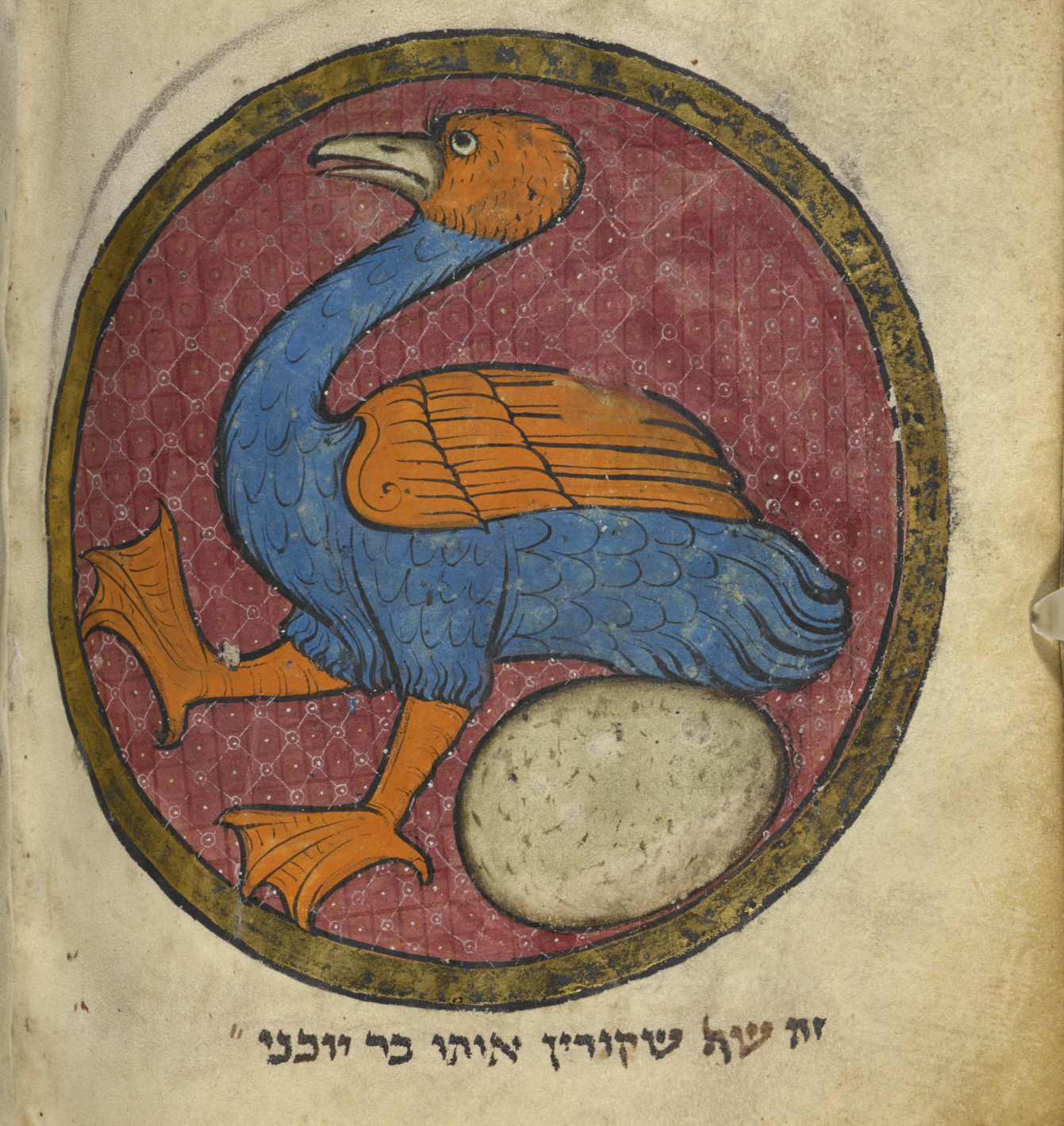
Bar yokni in the London Miscellany, a manuscript produced c. 1300.

The bar yokni (Hebrew: בר יוכני or בר יכני, lit. 'son of the nest') is a giant bird mentioned several times in the Talmud.

== Description ==
A source from the early third century, while recounting a series of extraordinary phenomena, claims that the bird was so large that one of its eggs dropped from a height flooded sixty cities and destroyed three hundred cedar trees. In two other passages, the egg and the bird are cited as examples of huge size.

An assertion suggesting that this bird would be reserved as a source of sustenance for the righteous during Messianic times appears in the writings of Elijah Levita.

== Identification ==
The Talmud identifies the bar yokni with the ostrich, mentioned in the Book of Job. It describes how this bird, after laying its egg, flies with it at a great height to its nest, where it puts it gently down. Other scholars connect the bar yokni with the ziz and the vâraghna, the swiftest bird mentioned in the Zend Avesta.

== See also ==
- Roc
- Ziz
