= Ziz =

Jewish mythological griffin-like bird

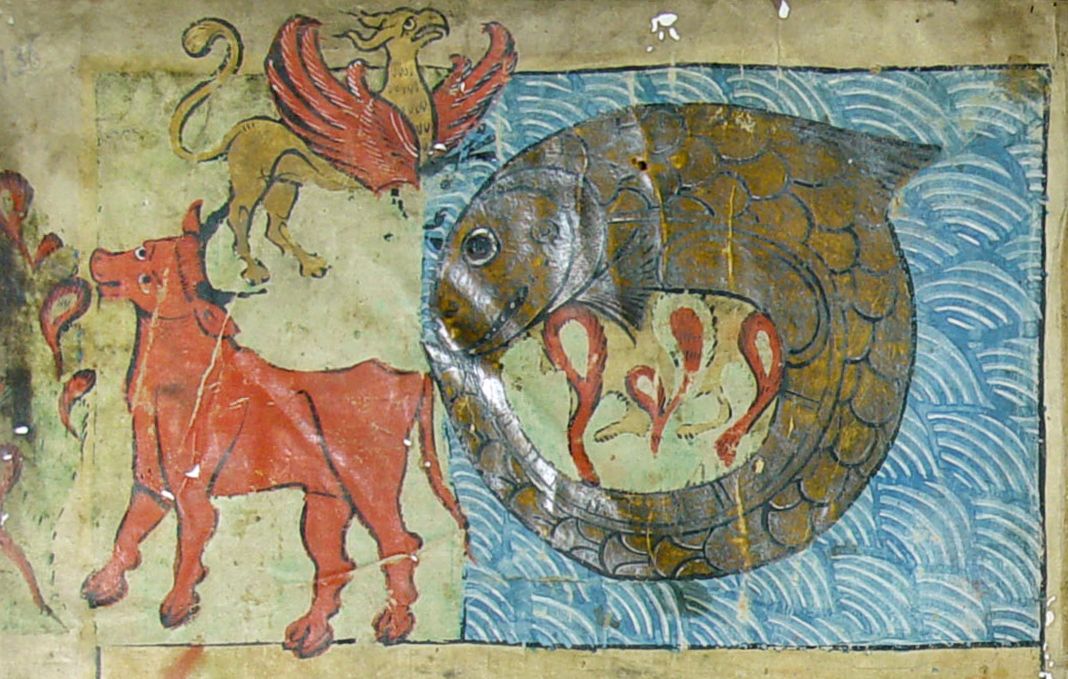
Clockwise from left: Behemoth (on earth), Ziz (in sky), and Leviathan (under sea). From an illuminated manuscript, 13th century AD.

The Ziz (Hebrew: זִיז, romanized: zîz) is a giant griffin-like bird in Jewish mythology, said to be large enough to be able to block out the sun with its wingspan.

== Description ==
The Ziz is considered a giant animal/monster corresponding to archetypal creatures. Rabbis have compared it to the Persian Simurgh, while modern scholars compare the Ziz to the Sumerian Anzû and the Ancient Greek phoenix.

There is only passing mention of the Ziz in the Bible, found in Psalms 50:11 "I know all the birds of the mountains and zîz śād̲ai [וְזִיז שָׂדַי] is mine" and Psalms 80:13 "The boar from the forest ravages it, and zîz śād̲ai feeds on it", and these are often lost in translation from the Hebrew, being referred to in most English translations as ambiguous "beasts" and referred to as neither singular nor avian (śād̲ai usually being translated as "of the field").

The Ziz is later referred to in the Jewish aggadot, namely the Talmudic tractates Bava Batra (in one of a sequence of fantastic voyages recounted by Rabbah bar bar Hana) and Bekhorot (as Renanim and Bar Yokni). The aggadot say of the Ziz:

As Leviathan is the king of fishes, so the Ziz is appointed to rule over the birds. His name comes from the variety of tastes his flesh has; it tastes like this, zeh, and like that, zeh. The Ziz is as monstrous of size as Leviathan himself. His ankles rest on the earth, and his head reaches to the very sky.

It did once happen that travelers on a vessel noticed a bird. As he stood in the water, it merely covered his feet, and his head knocked against the sky. The onlookers thought the water could not have any depth at that point, and they prepared to take a bath there. A heavenly voice warned them: "Alight not here! Once a carpenter's axe slipped from his hand at this spot, and it took it seven years to touch bottom." The bird the travelers saw was none other than the Ziz. His wings are so huge that unfurled they darken the sun. They protect the earth against the storms of the south; without their aid the earth would not be able to resist the winds blowing thence. Once an egg of the Ziz fell to the ground and broke. The fluid from it flooded sixty cities, and the shock crushed three hundred cedars. Fortunately such accidents do not occur frequently. As a rule the bird lets her eggs slide gently into her nest. This one mishap was because the egg was rotten, and the bird cast it away carelessly.

The Ziz has another name, Renanim, because he is the celestial singer. On account of his relation to the heavenly regions, he is also called Sekwi, the seer, and, besides, he is called "son of the nest," because his fledgling birds break away from the shell without being hatched by the mother bird; they spring directly from the nest, as it were. Like Leviathan, so Ziz is a delicacy to be served to the pious at the end of time, to compensate them for the privations which abstaining from the unclean fowls imposed upon them. [...] The creation of the fifth day, the animal world, rules over the celestial spheres. Witness the Ziz, which can darken the sun with its pinions.

== Later interpretations ==
Non-Jews also knew of the Ziz. Johannes Buxtorf's 1603 Synagoga Judaica discusses the Ziz. His text is echoed in English by Samuel Purchas in 1613:

Elias Leuita reporteth of a huge bird, also called Bariuchne, to be rosted at this feast; of which the Talmud saith, that an egge sometime falling out of her nest, did ouerthrow and breake downe three hundred tall Cedars; with which fall the egge being broken, ouerflowed and carried away sixtie Villages... But to take view of other strange creatures, make roome, I pray, for another Rabbi with his Bird; and a great deale of roome you will say is requisite: Rabbi Kimchi on the 50. Psalme auerreth out of Rabbi Iehudah, that Ziz is a bird so great, that with spreading abroad his wings, he hideth the Sunne, and darkeneth all the world. And (to leape back into the Talmud) a certaine Rabbi sayling on the Sea, saw a bird in the middle of the Sea, so high, that the water reached but to her knees; whereupon he wished his companions there to wash, because it was so shallow; Doe it not (saith a voyce from heauen) for it is seuen yeares space since a Hatchet, by chance falling out of a mans hand in this place, and alwayes descending, is not yet come at the bottome.

Humphrey Prideaux in 1698 describes the Ziz as being like a giant celestial rooster:

For in the Tract Bava Bathra of the Babylonish Talmud, we have a Story of such a prodigious Bird, called Ziz, which standing with his Feet upon the Earth, reacheth up unto the Heavens with his head, and with the spreading of his Wings darkneth the whole Orb of the Sun, and causeth a total Eclipse thereof. This Bird the Chaldee Paraphrast on the Psalms says, is a Cock, which he describes of the same bigness, and tells us that he crows before the Lord. And the Chaldee Paraphrast on Job also tells us of him, and of his crowing every morning before the Lord, and that God giveth him Wisdom for this purpose.

== See also ==
- Bar yokni
- Behemoth
- Cherub
- Garuda
- Golem
- Griffin
- Leviathan
- Minokawa
- Rayquaza
- Roc
- Tawûsî Melek
