= Duidain =

Wilderness described in the Book of Enoch

Duidain is a wilderness named in the Book of Enoch as inhabited by the beast Behemoth and being to the east of the Garden of Eden.

The Book of Parables 60:8 states

But the masculine is named Behemoth, who occupies, with his breast, a void desert called Dêndâin, in the east of the garden where the chosen and holy will dwell, where my grandfather was taken up, the seventh from Adam, the first of men whom the Lord of the spirits made.

== See also ==
- Land of Nod, a place east of Eden where Cain was exiled to.
