= Book of Job in Byzantine illuminated manuscripts =

Book of Job, illuminated manuscript

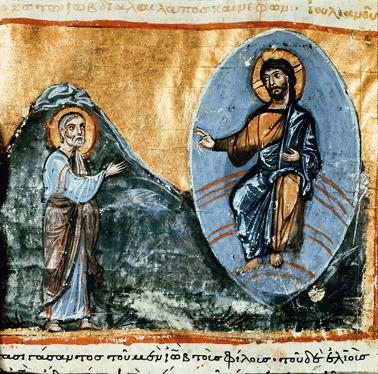
God speaks to Job. JobXXXVIII, Mount Athos; Megisti Lavra Monastery, Codex B. 100, 12th century.

There are fourteen known Byzantine manuscripts of the Book of Job dating from the 9th to 14th centuries, as well as a post-Byzantine codex illuminated with cycle of miniatures. The quantity of Job illustrations survived in the fifteen manuscripts exceeds 1800 pictures. The total is aggregated considerably by single images of Job in other manuscripts, frescoes and carvings.

== Book of Job ==
The theological core of the work and its content have been much discussed since the pre-Christian age, especially the problem of human misfortune and in particular the misfortune of the righteous in relation to the prevailing concept of divine justice. In that it uses as departure point the literary framework of the story of Job, a devout, wealthy and respected man, who, with God's permission, was struck by Satan with the greatest misfortunes. Being a king, according to the Septuagint, Job was the model of the God-fearing, wise and philanthropic ruler who was also enjoying a peaceful life in the bosom of his large family and among his friends. It was precisely this deep piety and the divine favour which incited the envy of Satan who - not without much effort - eventually succeeded in obtaining God's consent to put Job to the test. Thus, in a rapid sequence of calamities, Job is robbed of all his possessions, his herds, his servants, his house and all his ten children. At the very last, smitten himself with the horrible disease of leprosy and abandoned by all, including his wife, he leaves the city and dwells on a dunghill. In spite of all these reversals of fate Job remains steadfast not only to his faith in God, but also to the conviction that this sudden reversal of the divine will cannot be the consequence of his own sins, since he does not believe that such exist. Finally, after many years of trial, God again reverses the just man's fate, restoring to him twofold all his worldly goods and giving him a new family.

== The Septuagint and related Job versions ==
=== Septuagint ===
The oldest translation of the Bible in Greek is known as Septuagint. Tradition propagated by the so-called Letter of Aristeas ascribes it in its entirety to a group of seventy Jewish scholars working at the order of Ptolemy II Philadelphus who ruled Egypt from 285 to 246 BCE. Modern research, however, indicates that the letter is a late-2nd-century BCE forgery and the account is mostly legendary. In actuality, the translation was probably carried out in stages between the 3rd and 1st centuries BC and was the work of Greek-speaking Jews of the Diaspora. (Note: For the general historical background of the Septuagint translation cf. E. Schurer, Geschichte des jüdischen Volkes, III, 3rd ed., Leipzig 1898, 304-317 and H.B. Swete, An Introduction to the Old Testament in Greek, 2nd ed., Cambridge 1902, revised by R.R. Ottley, Cambridge 1914 (reprinted New York 1968)) The only indication for dating the translation of the Book of Job in that chronological framework is an excerpt from a Hellenistic–Judaic work (ʺΠερί Ἰουδαίωνʺ) by the above-mentioned Alexandrian historian Aristeas. (Note: Cf. thorough investigation of the subject by J. Freudenthal, Hellenistische Studien, Breslau 1875, I, 136–141.) This excerpt, which was incorporated by Alexander Polyhistor in his compilation and thus was preserved by Eusebius, (Note: Preparatio Evangelica, IX. 25, ed. T. Gifford, Oxford 1903, 430–431.) contains a brief biography of Job. The striking similarity between this and appendices contained in most Greek manuscripts of the Book of Job (in addition to that, the excerpt – according to the prevailing view – presupposes the Greek translation of the Septuagint), leads to the conclusion that the Book of Job in the Greek translation was known to a writer (Aristeas) before the time of Alexander Polyhistor, that is, about the middle of the 2nd century BC. (Note: Freudenthal, op. cit., 143; cf. also K. Kohler, The Testament of Job, an Essene Midrash on the Book of Job, in Semitic Studies in Memory of Rev. Alexander Kohut, Berlin 1897, 264-338 and L. Ginzberg, The Legends of the Jews, vol. V, 384, n. 14, Philadelphia 1938–46.)

Furthermore, this date conforms to and confirms the general impression given by the Greek text that it is genuinely Hellenistic, created by and familiar to circles relatively alien to a solely Judaic way of thinking. The character of the Septuagint text mentioned above, which undertakes to give the genealogy of Job and to identify his three friends, is not the only significant deviation-addition peculiar to the Greek edition. The text of the Book of Job shows so many extensive and essential differences from the Hebrew original, that one must infer either deliberate modification of the prototype, at least to a certain extent, by the Greek translator or the use of a prototype unknown today. (Note: This view of an original deviating from the Masoretic text is represented mainly by J. Jeffrey, The Masoretic Text and the Septuagint Compared, with Special Reference to the Book of Job, in Expository Times 36 (1924–25), 70–73. A shorter original than the Septuagint text is supposed by M. Jastrow Jr., The Book of Job. Its Origin, Growth and Interpretation, Philadelphia and London 1920, 93.) The most striking peculiarity is the extensive omissions noted and commented on quite early. According to Origen (AD 184–254), the Greek text of the Septuagint was shorter by one sixth than the Hebrew, (Note: See Origen's Epistle to Africanus, in A. Roberts et al., Ante-Nicene Fathers, vol. IV (reprint), Grand Rapids (MI) 1989, 386ff. Also see S. Driver - G. Gray, A Critical and Exegetical Commentary on the Book of Job together with a New Translation (The International Critical Commentary), 2nd ed., Edinburgh 1950; LXXI-LXXVI.) whereas St. Jerome testifies to a difference of over one fourth. (Note: See Praefatio in Job, in J. Migne (ed.), Patrologia Latina, vol. 28, Paris 1855, 1080.) To these omissions, which at present are estimated to total about 187 verses, must be added the abbreviations as well as the padding of frequently free translation, amounting to a paraphrase of the prototype, which all show not only that there was a tendency to abbreviate the prototype but also that the translator apparently does not seem to have troubled himself extensively with the most difficult passages. The passages constituting a plain transcript into Greek of the Hebrew prototype are particularly notable in this respect. (Note: Cf. J. Ziegler, Der textkritische Wert der Septuaginta des Buches Job, Miscellanea Biblica, 2, Rome 1934, 277–296; G. Gerleman, Studies in the Septuagint, I, Book of Job, in Lunds Universitets Arsskrift, vol. 43, Nr. 2, Lund 1946, 17ff.) Aside from the translator's obvious difficulties with the text, recent studies indicate that the proven deviations were deliberate rather than a consequence merely of the translator's inadequacy. (Note: Cf. especially the following studies: Gerleman, op. cit.; K.S. Gehman, The Theological Approach of the Greek Translator of the Book of Job 1-15, in Journal of Biblical Literature LXVIII (1949), 231–240; D.H. Gard, The Exegetical Method of the Greek Translator of the Book of Job, in Journal of Biblical Literature, Monograph Series, vol. VIII, Philadelphia 1952. Cf. also the articles by H.M. Orlinsky, in Hebrew Union College Annual 28 (1957), 53–74; 29 (1958), 229–271; 30 (1959), 153–167; 32 (1961), 229–268; 33 (1962), 119–152; 35 (1964), 57–78. Orlinsky gives a thorough bibliographical survey on the subject.) Examined in this light, the Septuagint text seems to express a particular theological tendency, evident in “emendations” of a dogmatic nature, which subsequently permeates the entire Book of Job. The main lines of this new theological approach to the “problem of Job” may be summarized as follows: In the first place, by presenting the devil as the main author of Job's misfortune, God is generally portrayed much milder than in the Hebrew original. Secondly, there is the tendency in the speeches to moderate the intensity of Job's polemic on God's will and conception of justice. Thus the Job of the Septuagint translation is not at all like the Job of the Hebrew prototype. This is so, not only because his speeches in the Septuagint are less provocative in tone, but also because a new element of patient submission and humility, unknown in the prototype, has been introduced here for the first time. These modifications which will turn out to be the chief characteristics of the hero of the story as presented in the Testament of Job will also be the basic element of the mediaeval Christian tradition in which Job appears as a big sufferer –the very model of patience and justice. The friends’ speeches have been similarly “emended”. Those of Elihu especially seem to have experienced more serious alterations. The main consequences of all these changes is that Job's standpoint is not clearly discerned from that of his friends, and, therefore, the problem itself is no longer as prominently outlined as in the prototype. The development of this dogmatic expunging culminates in the Testament of Job, where the atrophied dialogue does not preserve even a trace of the philosophical-theological analysis of the problem provided in the original poem. The Testament of Job is therefore thought by several scholars to be based entirely on the Greek translation. (Note: Cf. especially Gerleman, op. cit.) Before concluding this brief survey of the textual problems, the remaining Greek translations must also be mentioned, since they were taken into account by the Church Fathers in their commentaries on the Book of Job and could, therefore, have a bearing on the iconography.

=== Independent translations ===
The earliest independent Greek translations of the Bible, which were also taken into account by Origen in his edition of the Hexapla, originated firstly in the opposition of Judaic theology to the Greek translation of the Septuagint after it had been officially accepted by the Christian Church and, secondly, with the intention to replace the Septuagint with a translation based on the unofficial standardized Hebrew text. These were the translations by Akylas, Theodotion, and Symmachus, the first of which dated about AD 130, and the other two in the 2nd and 3rd centuries respectively. Akylas is the only one of the three translators to be referred to in all sources as a Jew. According to Eusebius, Symmachus was a Christian, whereas Theodotion is referred to in some sources as a Jew and in others as a Christian. (Note: For Akylas and Theodotion see . E. Schurer, Geschichte des jüdischen Volkes, III, 3rd ed., Leipzig 1898, 317–324. For Symmachus, see Eusebius, Historia Ecclesiae, VI, 17 and L.J. Liebreich, Notes on the Greek Version of Symmachus, in Journal of Biblical Literature 63 (1944), 397–403. For all Greek versions of the Old Testament cf. Swete, op. cit. (n. 1), 29–58.) Unfortunately, all three works have only come down to us fragmentary, and they differ significantly from one another in regard to the accuracy in rendering the Hebrew text and in the handling of the Greek language. Akylas’ translation is an attempt to reproduce with the greatest accuracy the details of the Hebrew text. Thus the general characteristic of his version is a bold literalness, which made it acceptable to Jews. This is also true of Symmachus, but with the difference that his effort is combined with excellent Greek. Finally, Theodotion's translation, characterized by a painstaking accuracy in the use of the Greek language combined with careful study of the Hebrew text, has found great response among Christians. It actually seems to be a revision of the translation of the Septuagint, based on the new revised edition of the Hebrew Scriptures. For this reason Origen draws almost exclusively on it to fill the lacunae in the translation of the Septuagint.

=== The Testament of Job ===
The earliest and most important text, especially with regard to the illustration of the Book of Job in this category, is the pseudepigraphical Testament of Job, which has survived in its oldest version in Greek, in the Slavonic translation derived from Greek and, in its latest form, from the Syrian and Arabic variants. (Note: The Greek manuscripts are: Paris. gr. 2658 of the 11th century; Messina, San Salvatore 29, of the year 1307 AD; Rome, Vat.gr. 1238, of the 13th century; Paris, gr. 938 of the 16th century, which is a transcript of Paris. gr. 2658. Of the Slavonic version there are three manuscripts in Belgrade, Moscow and Săfarik (S. Novakovič, Apokrifna priča o Jovu, in Starine 10 (1878),157-170; G. Polvika, Apokrifna priča o Jovu, loc. cit. 24 (1891), 135–155). The Greek text was first published by Cardinal Angelo Mai (in Scriptorum Veterum Nova Collectio, VII, Rome 1833, 180–191) from the Vatican manuscript. This text was reprinted along with an English translation and a valuable introduction by Kohler. See Kohler, Testament, 264–338. The same year M.R. James printed the text of the Paris manuscript also with a very useful introduction (James, Testament). A critical edition of the text, based on the manuscripts Paris. gr. 2658, Messina and Vatican, is presented by S.P. Brock (The Testament of Job, Edited with an Introduction and Critical Notes – Pseudepigrapha Veteris Testament Greece, II, Leiden 1966). Our references to the Testament text are also from this work. Cf. also R. Kraft et al., The Testament of Job, Society of Biblical Literature, Text and Translations, 5, Pseudepigrapha series, 4, Missoula (MT) 1974 and R. Splittlev, The Testament of Job. Introduction, Translation and Notes (HarvardUniversity Dissertation), Cambridge (MA) 1971. Excerpts of Mai's text are reprinted by S. Baring-Gould in Legends of the Patriarchs, New York 1872, 245–251. There are also several translations: the oldest, in French by Migne, in Dictionnaire desApocryphes, vol. II, Paris 1858, 403 is based on Mai's edition, while that of M. Philonenko (Le Testament de Job, in Semitica, Cahiers publies par l’Institut des Etudes Semitiques de l’Universite de Paris, XVIII, Paris, 1968), also in French, follows Brock's edition, while the German, by P. Riessler (Altjüdisches Schrifttum ausserhalb der Bibel, Augsburg 1928, 1104–1134) follows the edition of James. For a more recent translation, see L. Wills, Ancient Jewish Novels, New York 2002.) The earliest mention of the Testament of Job is in the decree of Pope Gelasius, promulgated about AD 496, in which it is condemned as apocryphal: “Liber qui appellatur Testamentum Job apocryphus”. (Note: Cf. Kohler, Testament, 264; James, Testament, LXXIII.)

Literally, it belongs to the “testaments”, an apocryphal body of writings which were compiled to preserve the teachings and the histories of great, usually Biblical, figures whose names they bear. (Note: E. Kautzsch, Die Apokryphen und Pseudepigraphen des Alten Testaments, I-II, Tübingen 1900; R.H. Charles, The Apocrypha and Pseudepigrapha of the Old Testament, I-II, Oxford 1913. In neitherof these collections is the Testament of Job included. See also J. Reeves (ed.), Tracing the Threads: Studies in the Vitality of Jewish Pseudepigrapha, Atlanta 1994.) Within this group the Testament of Job is, in its general complexion, more related to the Testament of The Twelve Patriarchs, while, like the Testament of Moses, it is characterized by a close adherence to the Bible text. Each constitute a haggadic commentary upon a canonical book – in other words, a midrash. (Note: Cf. James, Testament, LXXXIV and Philonenko, op. cit., 12–13.)

== List of Byzantine manuscripts with cycles of miniatures ==
=== Rome, Biblioteca Apostolica Vaticana, Codex Gr. 749. ===
Date: Second half of the 9th century. Provenance: Italy, (Rome?). The codex consists of 249 parchment leaves 27.3 x 37.7 cm and 55 miniatures.

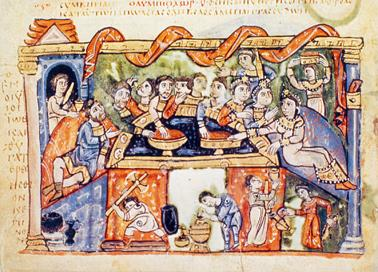
fol.16v-Job I.13

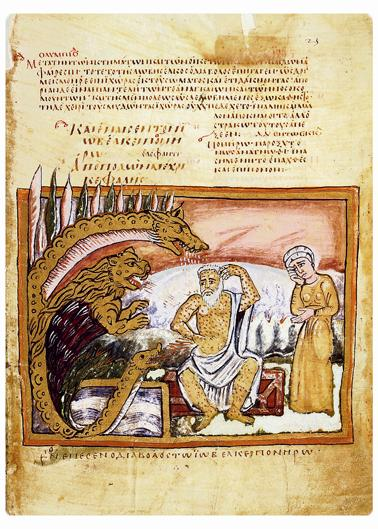
fol.25-Job II.7

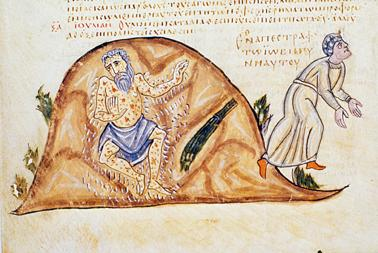
fol.28v-Job II.9/10

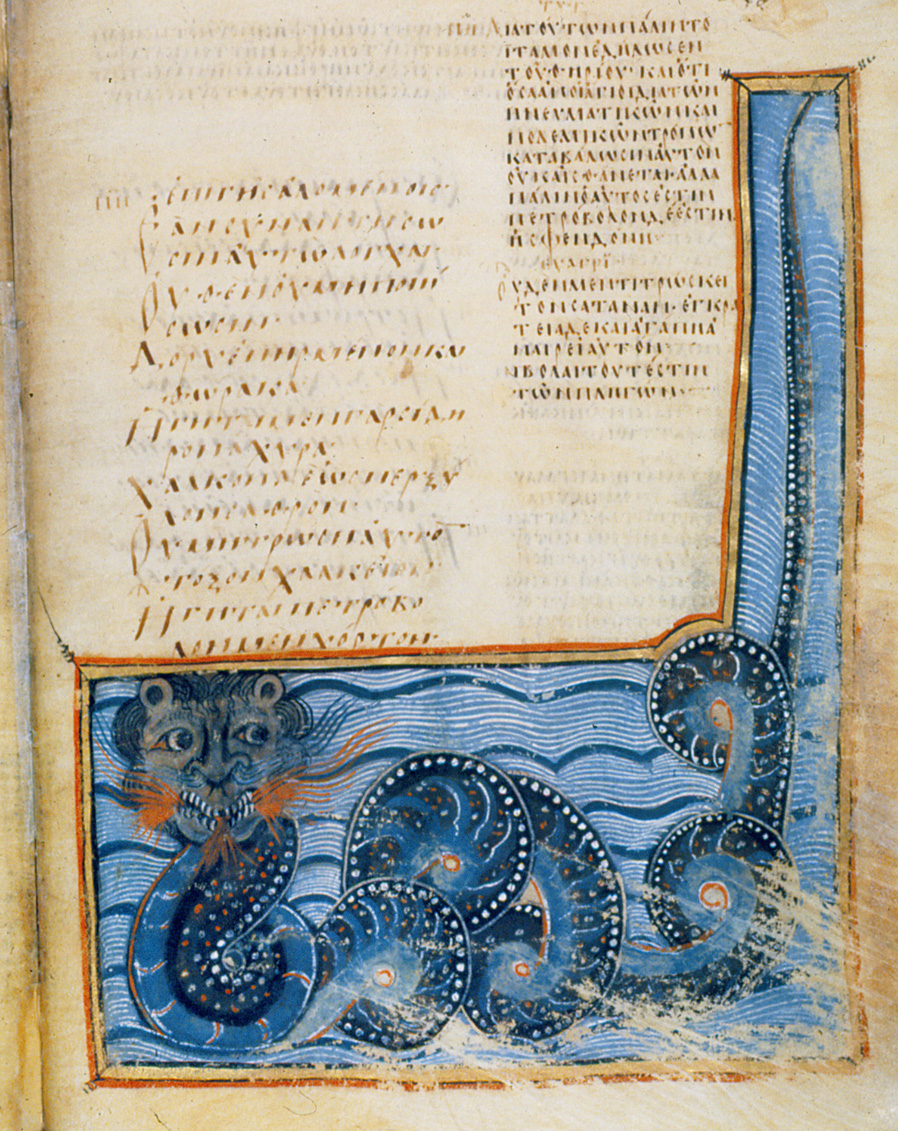
fol.238- XLI.22/23

=== Patmos, Monastery of St. John the Theologian, Codex 171 ===
Date: 9th century (?), Provenance: Asia Minor (?). The manuscript consists of 258 folios 37 x 25.5 cm and 39 miniatures. Several leaves are missing and a later insertion, on page 516, informs us that the codex was purchased by a woman named Eudocia from a Rhodian with the name Leon in the year 959.

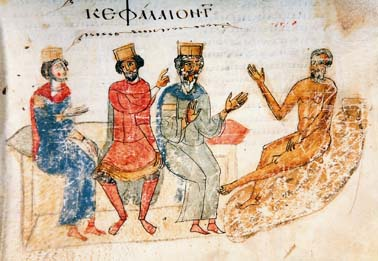
p. 75-Job.IV.1

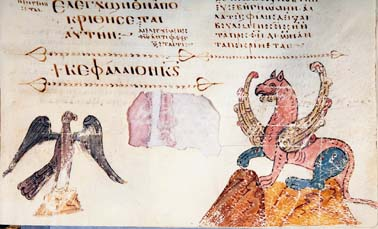
p. 475-XXXIX.26/30

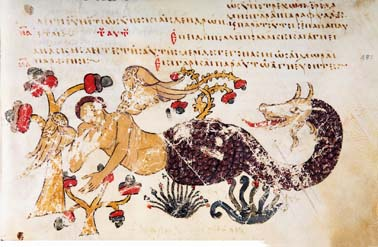
p. 487-Job.XL.16/17

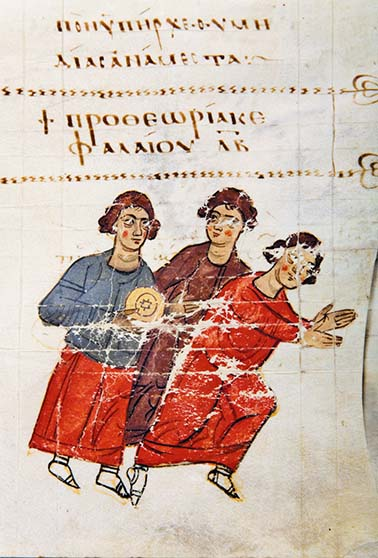
p. 507-Job.XLII.11

=== Venice, Biblioteca Nazionale Marciana, Codex Gr. 538 ===
Date: 905 AD, Provenance: Asia Minor (?). The codex consists of 246 leaves 27 x 37.5 cm and 31 miniatures.

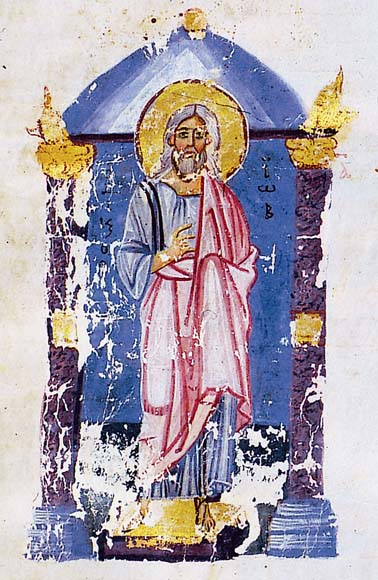
fol.5-Job.I.1

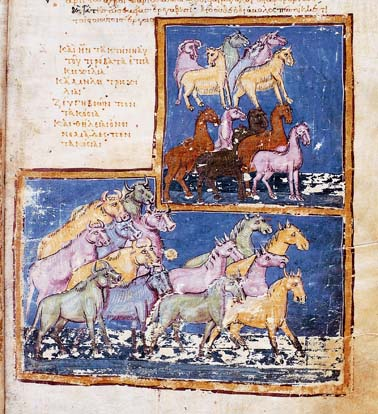
fol.6-Job.I.3

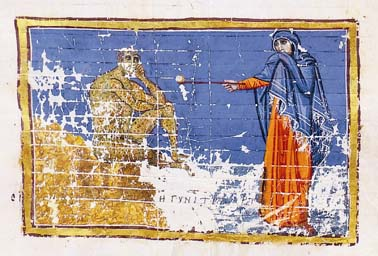
fol.23-Job.II.9/10

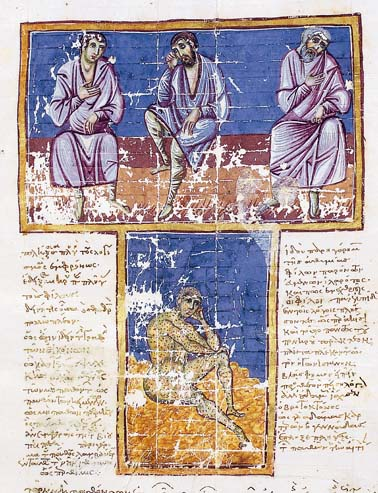
fol.27-Job.II.13

=== Mount Sinai, Saint Catherine's Monastery, Codex gr.3, ===
Date: 11th century. Provenance: Constantinople. The codex consists of 246 leaves, 34.9 x 24.3 cm and 27 miniatures which are all inserted in the Prologue text.

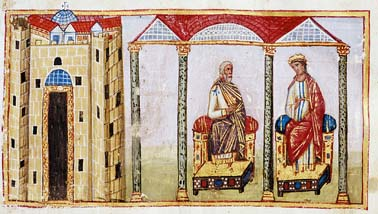
fol.7-Job.I.1

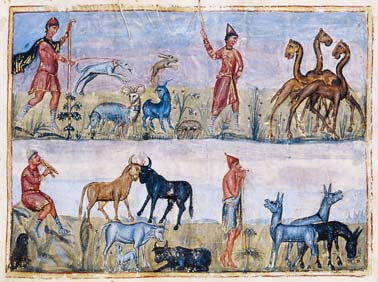
fol.8-Job.I.3

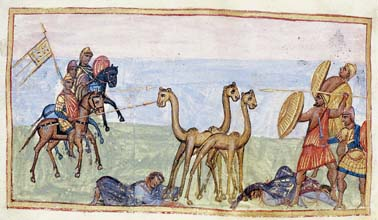
fol.19v-Job.I.17

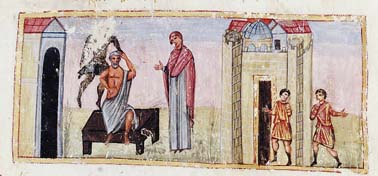
fol.25v-Job.II.7

=== Jerusalem, Greek Patriarchal Library, Codex Taphou 5 ===
Date: c. 1300 AD. The codex consists of 260 parchment leaves 25.3 x 36.5 cm and 115 miniatures. At the beginning, three leaves-formerly belonging to a codex of the 11th century are bound with it. Another leaf was cut off and is in the National Library of Russia, St. Petersburg under the shelfmark gr. 382.

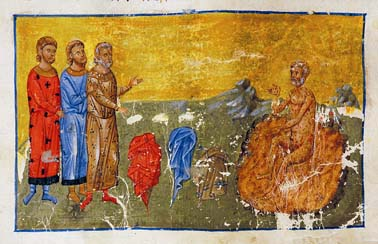
fol.42v-Job.II.12

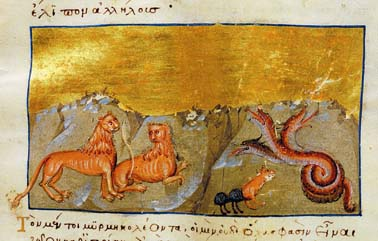
fol.58-Job.IV.10/11

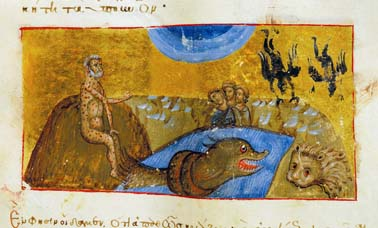
fol.90-Job.IX.13

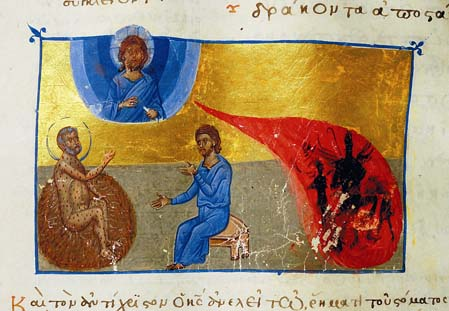
fol.176v-Job.XXVI.13

=== Rome, Biblioteca Apostolica Vaticana, Codex Gr. 1231 ===
Date: First quarter of the 12th century. Provenance: Cyprus (?). The manuscript consists of 457 parchment leaves and 149 miniatures. The two texts in the colophon are of great value in determining the codex's date and origin by providing the names of Leon Nikerites and Anna Notara.

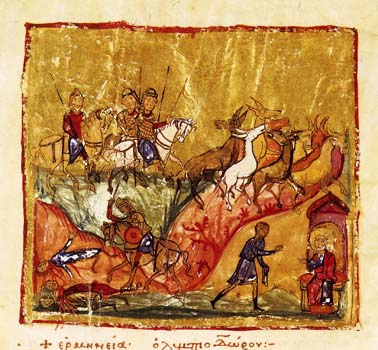
fol.36v-Job.I.14/15

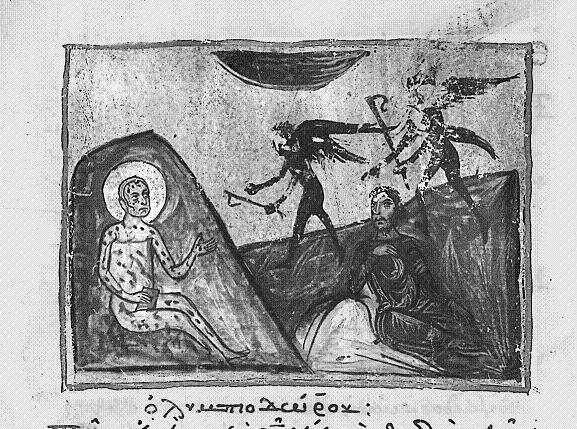
fol.240v-XVI.10/14

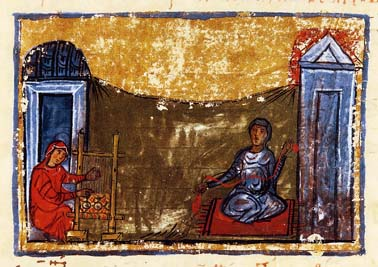
fol.410-XXXVIII.36

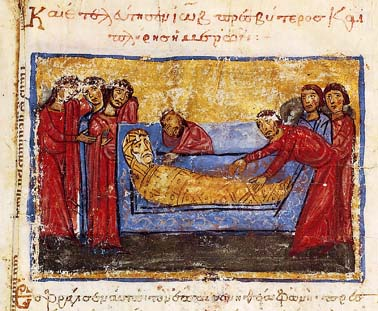
fol.453-Job.XLII.17

=== Mount Athos, Megisti Lavra Monastery, Codex B. 100 ===
Date: 12th century. The codex, incomplete today, begins with the fourth chapter of the Job text and consists of 196 parchment leaves 30 x 22 cm. and 33 miniatures. It is a textkatenen manuscript written in cursive script with large, blocky letters, very much resembling the script of V1231.

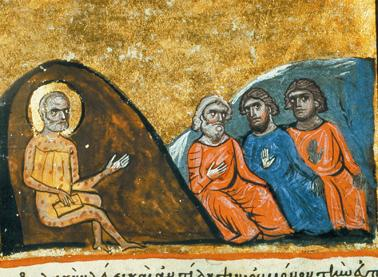
fol.124-Job.XXIX

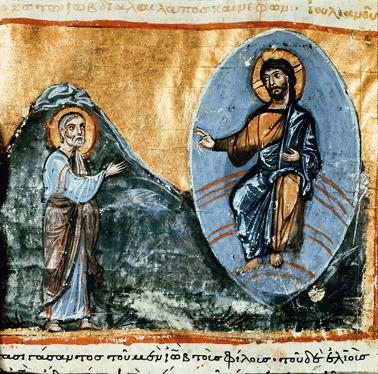
fol.165-Job.XXXVIII

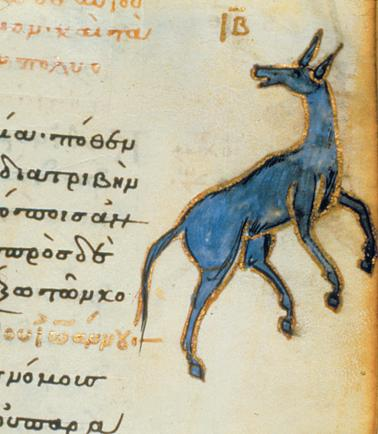
fol.174-XXXIX.5/6

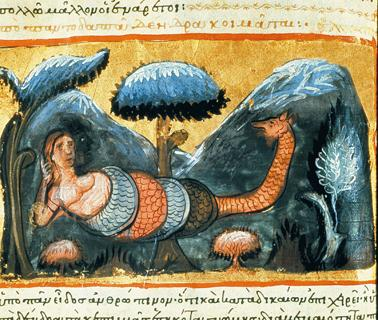
fol.181v-Job.XL.17

=== Rome, Biblioteca Apostolica Vaticana, Codex Pal. Gr. 230 ===
Date: 11th to 12th centuries. The codex consists of 246 parchment leaves and 152 miniatures.

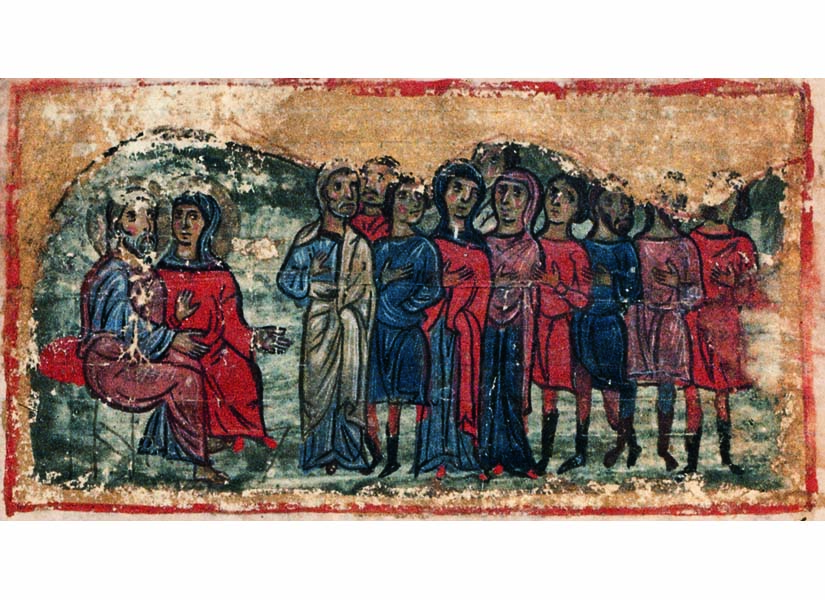
fol.9-Job.I.1/2

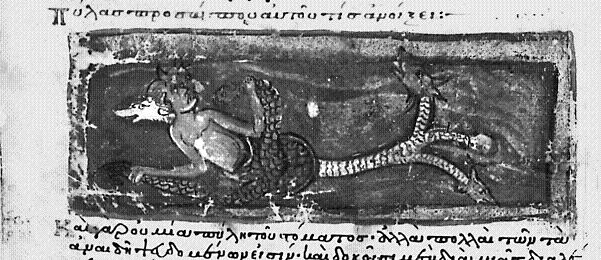
fol.232v-Job.XLI.5-

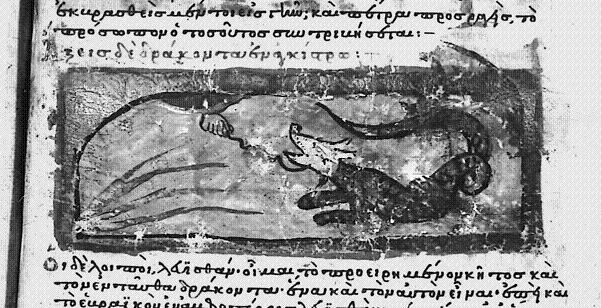
fol.229-Job.XL.20-

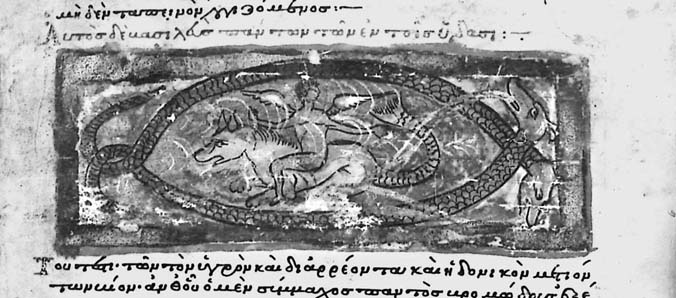
fol.237-Job.XLI.25

=== Mount Athos, Vatopedi Monastery, Codex 590 ===
Date: 13th century. The codex consists of 168 parchment leaves, measuring about 26.5 x 28.2 cm and includes 48 miniatures, all painted straight on the parchment without a background or frame.

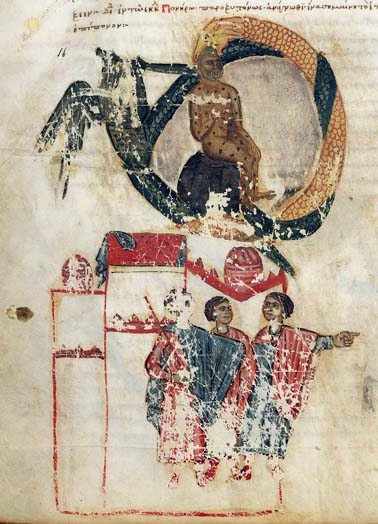
fol.18v-Job.II.7

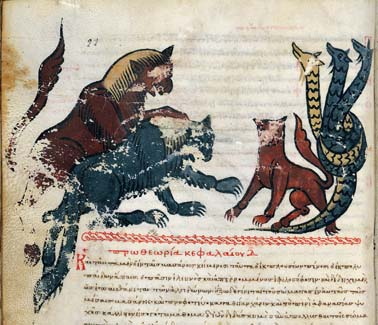
fol.29v-Job.IV.10/11

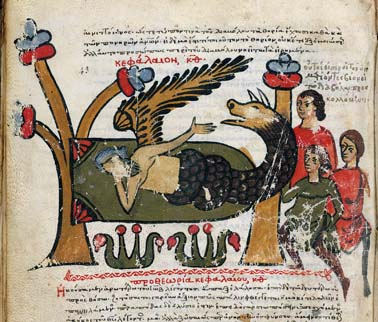
fol.163v-Job.XLI.25

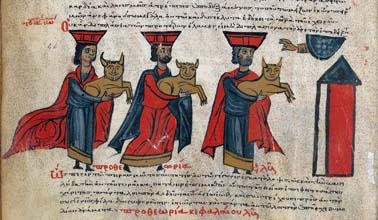
fol.165v-Job.XLII.8/9

=== Athens, Byzantine Museum, Codex gr.164 (formerly 62) ===
Date: End of the 12th century. The codex consists of 278 parchment leaves 16.5 x 23.5 cm, and was planned to include 154 miniatures -which were never executed

=== Oxford, Bodleian Library, MS. Barocci 201 ===
Date: 12th century. The codex consists of 253 parchment leaves and 234 miniatures.

=== Rome, Biblioteca Apostolica Vaticana, Codex Gr. 751 ===
Date: End of the 12th to the beginning of the 13th century. The codex, at present has 168 parchment leaves and 227 miniatures.

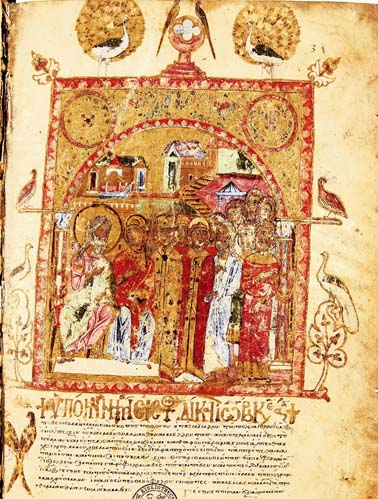
fol.3-Job.I.1/2

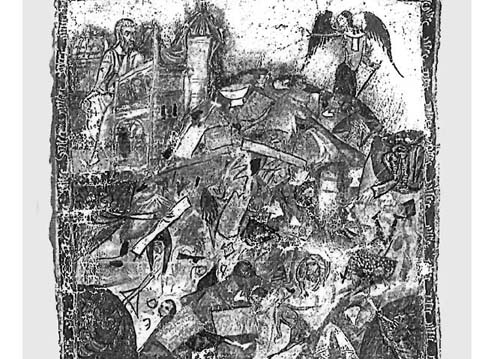
fol.17-Job.I.18/19

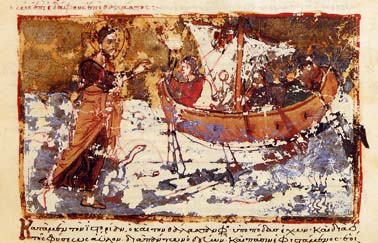
fol.59 bottom-IX.8

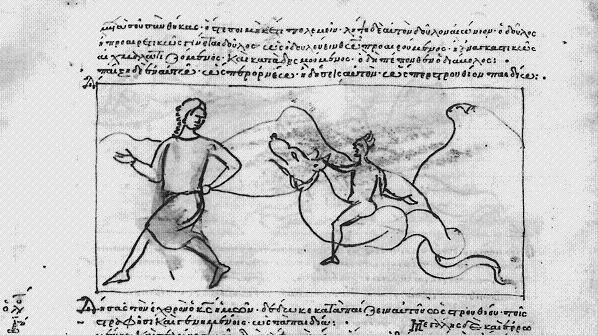
fol.154v-Job.XL.24

=== Paris, Bibliothèque Nationale, Codex Gr. 134 ===
Date: 13th (?) - beginning of the 14th century. The codex consists of 210 parchment leaves 22.5 x 23.5 cm and 176 miniatures.

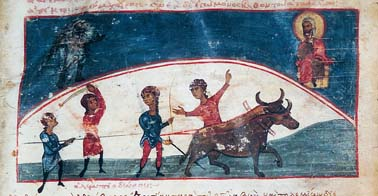
fol.22-Job.I.14/15

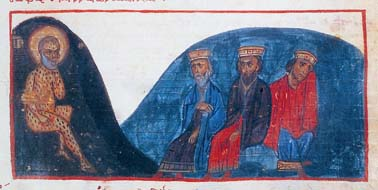
fol.46-Job.II.13

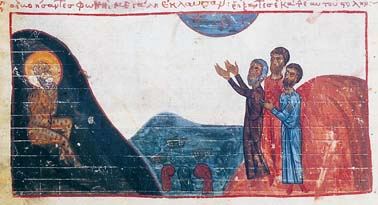
fol.46v-Job.II.12

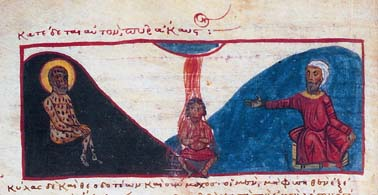
fol.124v-Job.XX.26

=== Paris, Bibliothèque Nationale, Codex Gr. 135 ===
Date: 1362 AD. Scribe: Manuel Tzykandyles. The oldest paper edition of the group, consisting of 247 folios 30.5 x 39 cm and 198 miniatures inserted in various ways in the text with the scenes shown without background or frame.

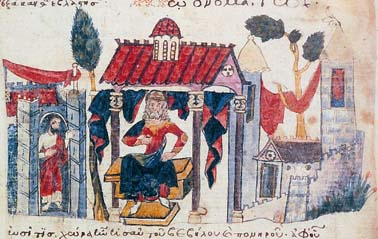
fol.5v-Job.I.1

=== Oxford, Bodleian Library, MS. Laud Gr. 86 ===
Date: 16th century. It consists of 220 paper leaves - with page numeration – and includes 205 miniatures.

== See also ==
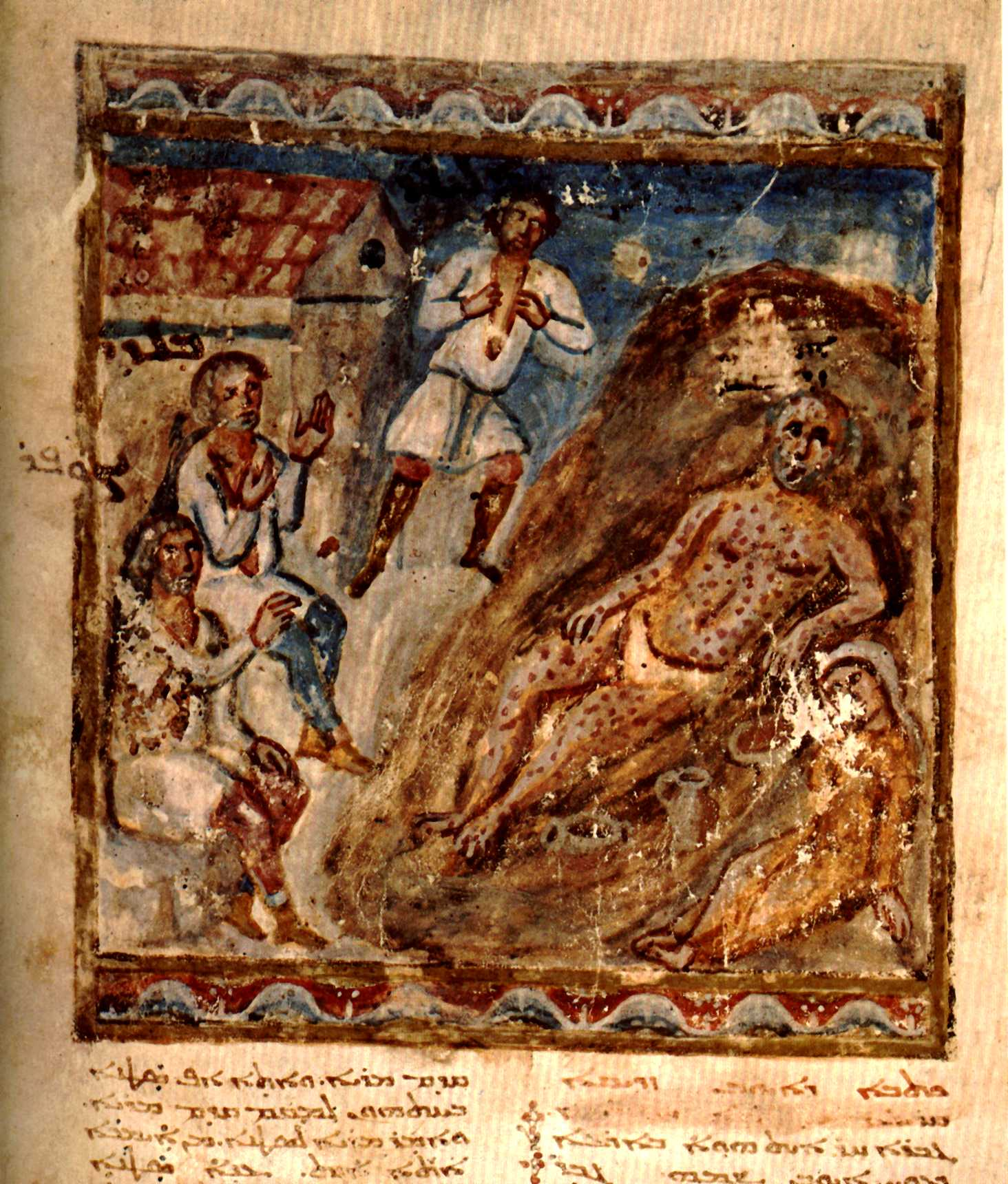
Syriac Bible.

- Book of Job
- Coptic Bible
- List of illuminated manuscripts
- Miniature (illuminated manuscript)
- Sarcophagus of Junius Bassus
- William Blake's Illustrations of the Book of Job

== Bibliography ==
- Brubaker, Leslie: Vision and Meaning in Ninth-Century Byzantium. ISBN 0-521-62153-4 & ISBN 978-0-521-62153-3
- Devoge, Jeanne: Quand Job tombe malade etude litteraire et iconographique d’une scene biblique d’apres la Septante. UDC 75.057.033.046.3 & UDC 801.73:27-243.62
- Hagedorn, Ursula & Dieter: Die älteren griechischen Katenen zum Buch Hiob. ISBN 3-11-015762-4 & ISBN 978-3-11-015762-8
- Blake, William: Illustrations of The Book of Job - (Gutenberg Project). https://www.gutenberg.org/ebooks/30526
- Papadaki-Oekland, Stella: Byzantine Illuminated Manuscripts of the Book of Job. ISBN 2-503-53232-2 & ISBN 978-2-503-53232-5
- [#3] The Septuagint LXX in English by Sir Lancelot Brenton
