= Serpent Column =

Greek victory column in Istanbul, Turkey

Coordinates: 41°00′20.33″N 28°58′30.43″E

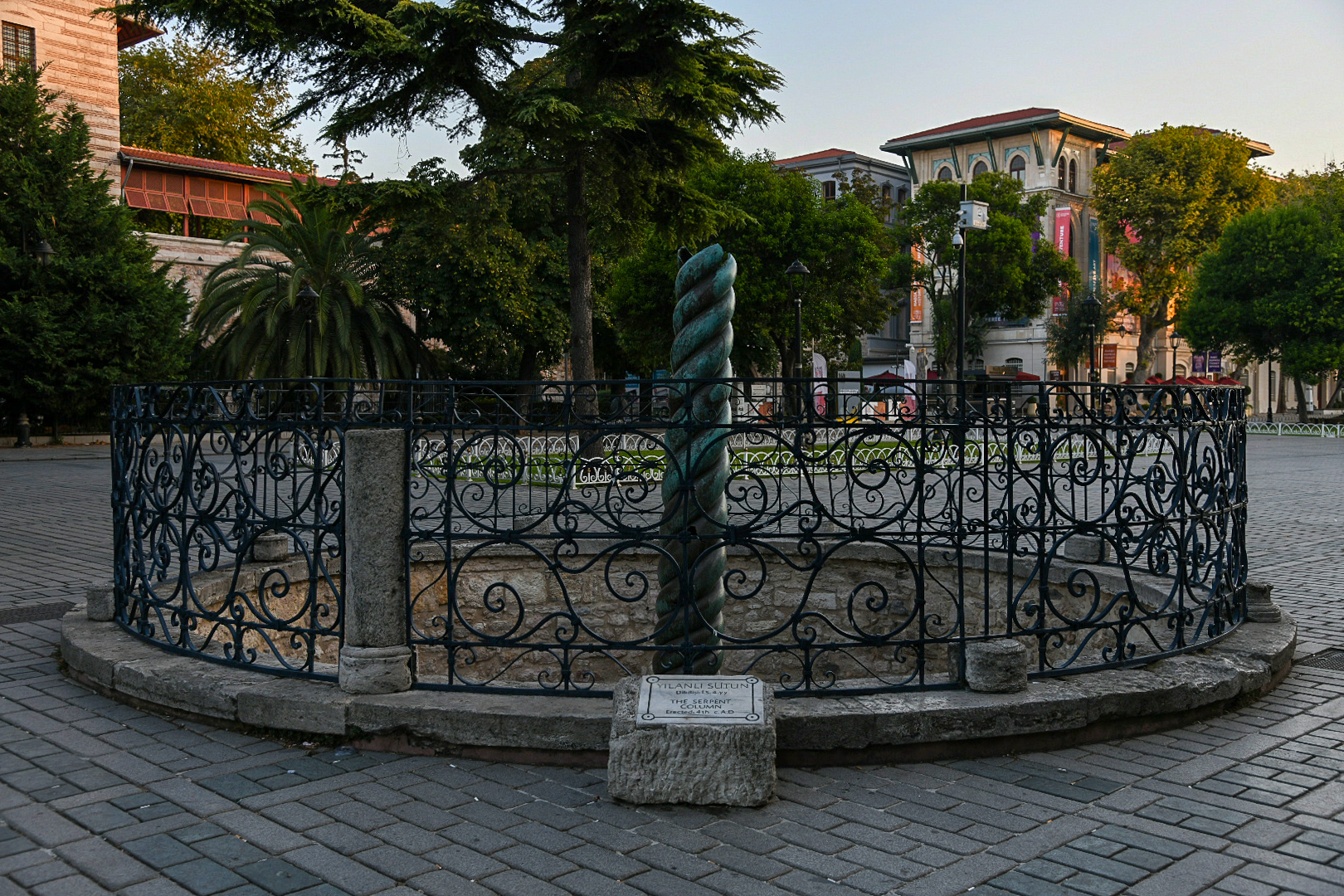
- The Serpent Column in Istanbul

- Location within Istanbul
- Location: Hippodrome of Constantinople (today Sultanahmet Square, Istanbul, Turkey)

The Serpent Column (Ancient Greek: Τρικάρηνος Ὄφις Τrikarenos Οphis "Three-headed Serpent"; Turkish: Yılanlı Sütun "Serpentine Column"), also known as the Serpentine Column, Plataean Tripod or Delphi Tripod, is an ancient bronze column at the Hippodrome of Constantinople (known as Atmeydanı "Horse Square" in the Ottoman period) in what is now Istanbul, Turkey. It is part of an ancient Greek sacrificial tripod, originally in Delphi and relocated to Constantinople by Constantine the Great in 324. It was built to commemorate the Greeks who fought and defeated the Persian Empire at the Battle of Plataea (479 BC). The serpent heads of the 8-metre (26 ft) high column remained intact until the end of the 17th century (one is on display at the nearby Istanbul Archaeology Museums).

== History ==
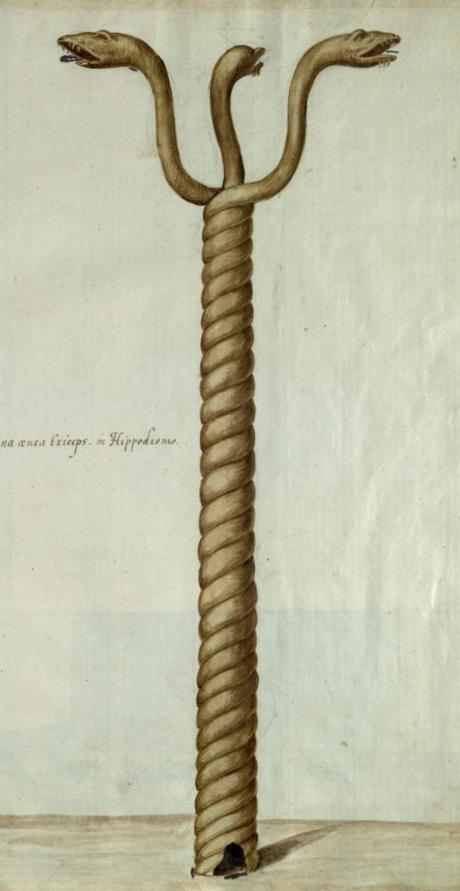
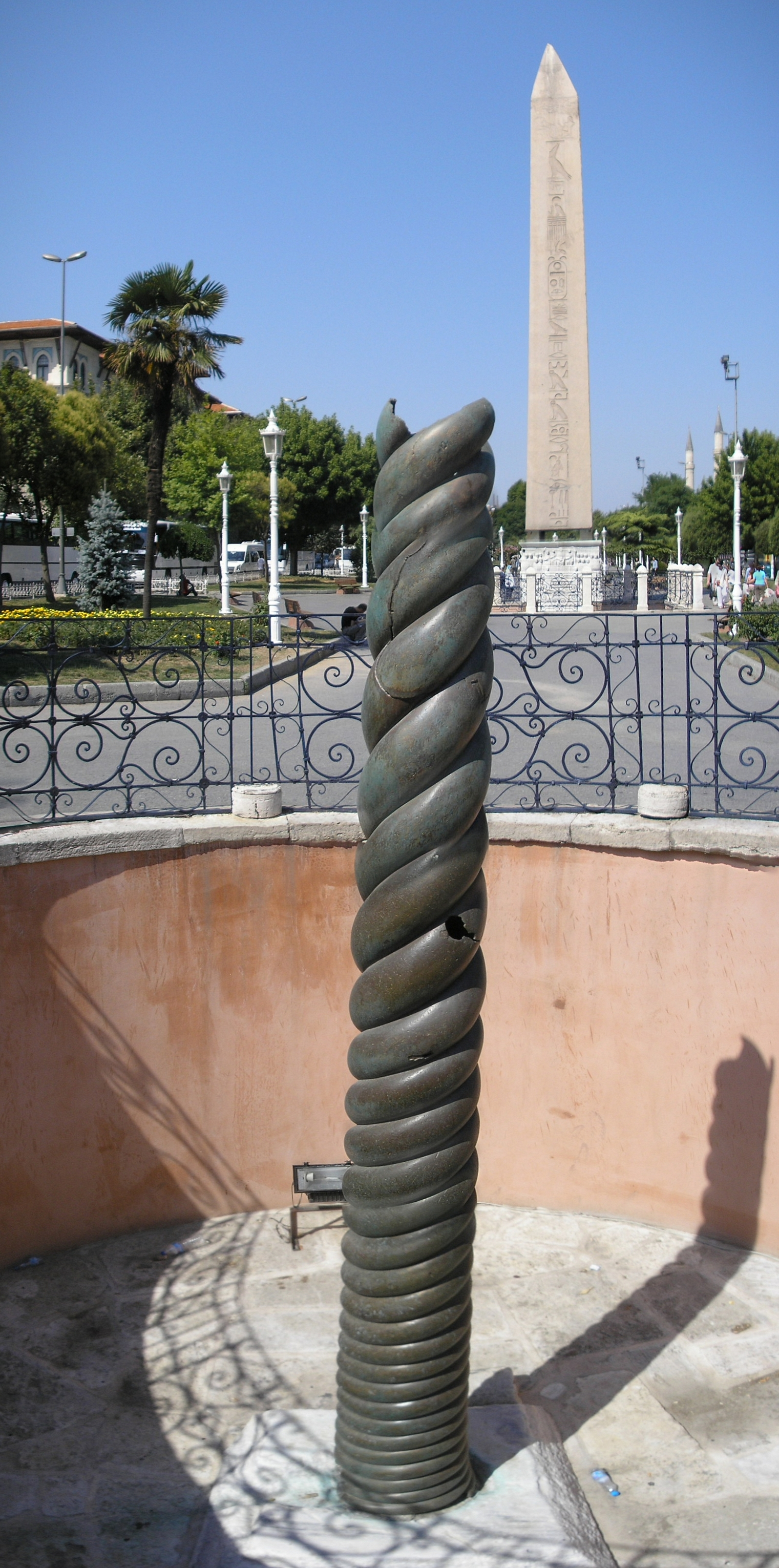
The Serpent Column: left, drawing of 1574 showing the column with the three serpent heads; right, the current state

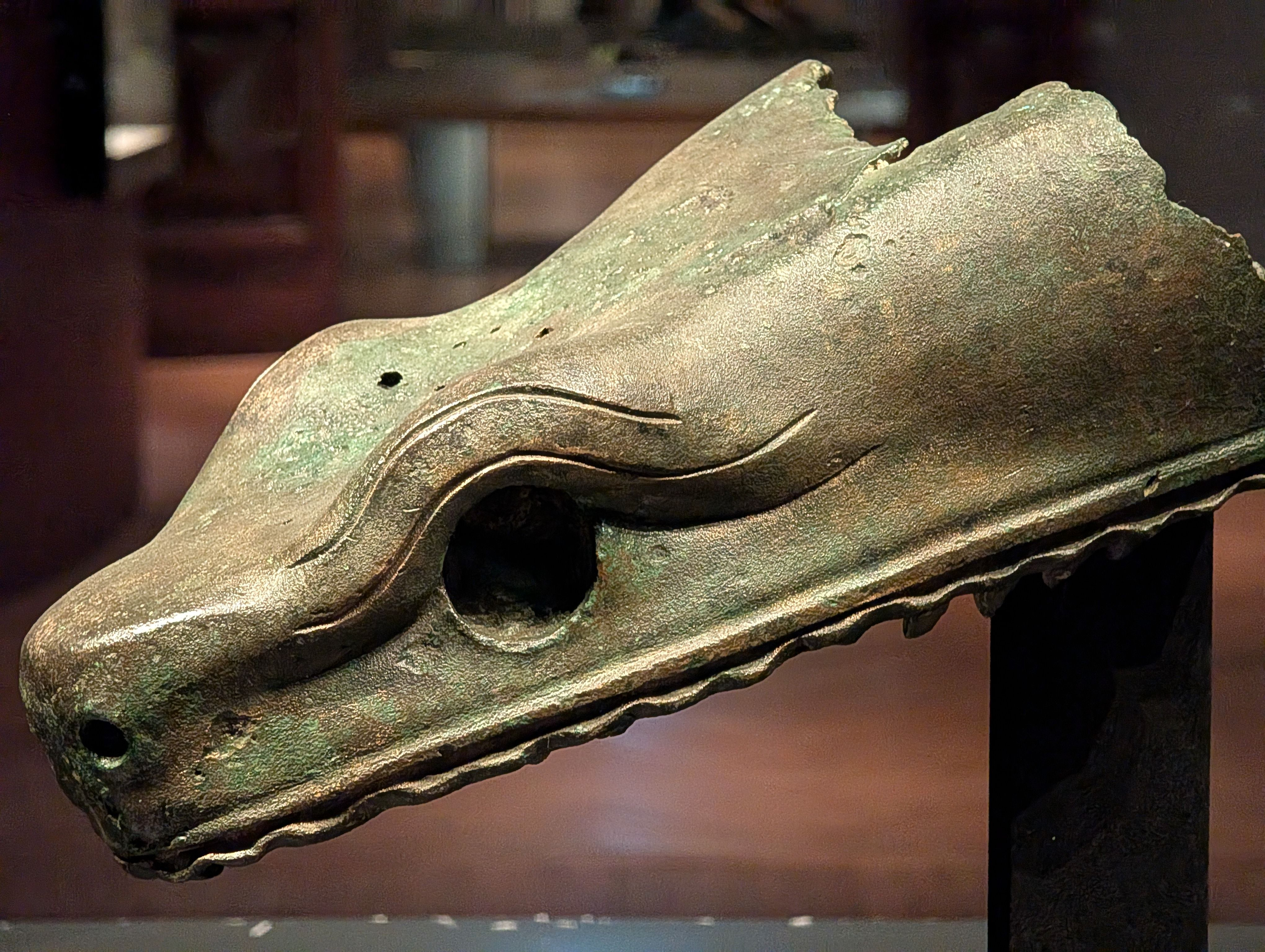
Fragmentary head of one of the column's serpents, now in Archaeological Museum of Istanbul, Turkey.

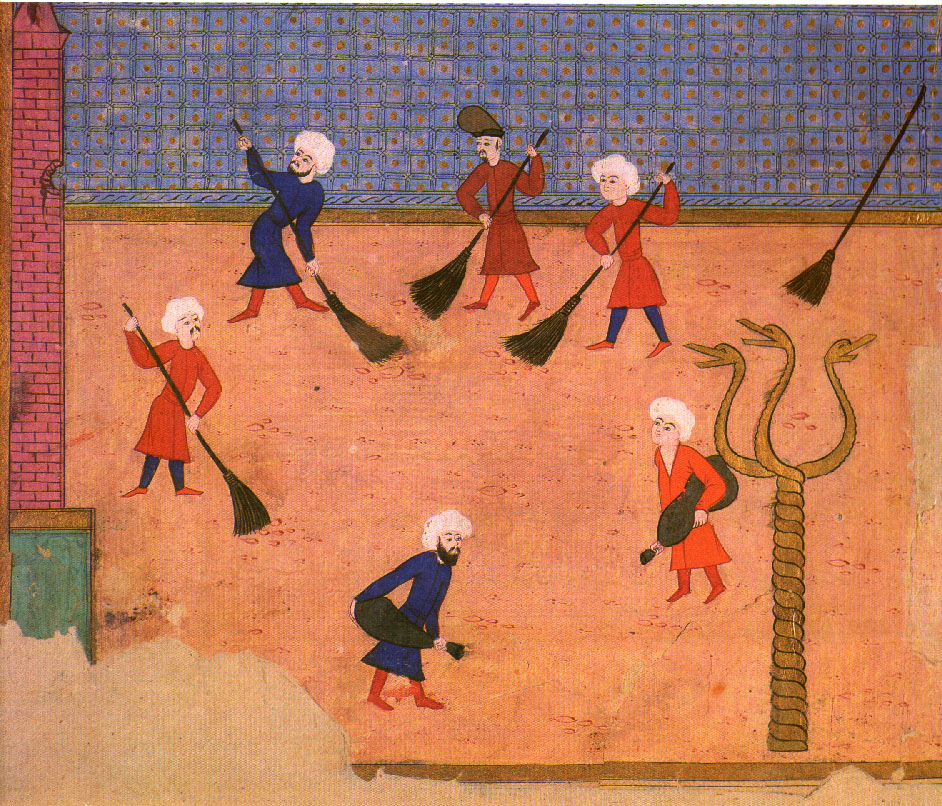
Ottoman miniature from the Surname-i Vehbi, showing the Column with the three serpent heads, but the bowl already missing, in a celebration at the Hippodrome in 1582

The Serpentine Column has one of the longest literary histories of any object surviving from Greek and Roman antiquity. Together with its original golden tripod and cauldron (both long missing), it constituted a trophy, or offering reminding of a military victory, dedicated to Apollo at Delphi. This offering was made in the spring of 478 BC, several months after the defeat of the Persian army in the Battle of Plataea (August 479 BC) by those Greek city-states in alliance against the Persian invasion of mainland Greece, during the Greco-Persian Wars. Among the writers who allude to the Column in the ancient literature are Herodotus, Thucydides, pseudo-Demosthenes, Diodorus Siculus, Pausanias the traveller, Cornelius Nepos and Plutarch. The removal of the column by the Emperor Constantine to his new capital, Constantinople, is described by Edward Gibbon, citing the testimony of the Byzantine historians Zosimus, Eusebius, Socrates, and Sozomenus.

=== Battle of Plataea ===
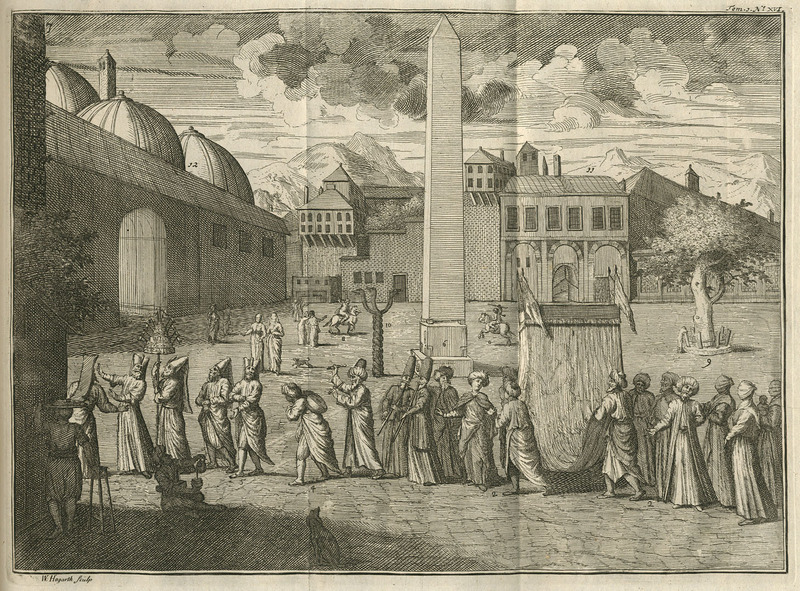
Western print, illustrating Aubry de la Mottraye, 1727

When the Persians invaded Greece under Xerxes in 480 BC, they were initially victorious at the Battle of Thermopylae, and the Battle of Artemisium in August. The Greeks defeated the Persian navy at the Battle of Salamis in September. After Salamis, Xerxes withdrew from Greece, but left a land force in Thrace, under the command of general Mardonius. He retook Athens in the spring of 479 BC and the war continued. On learning that a Spartan force was coming from the Peloponnese, Mardonius set fire to Athens again and removed his force to a strategic position in Boeotia, north of the river Asopus. The Greeks under the leadership of Pausanias, Regent of Sparta, (Note: Pausanias was regent to his cousin, King Pleistarchus, son of Leonidas, who was still a minor.) drew up on high ground in defensive positions south of the river Asopus and above the plain of Plataea. After days of skirmishing and changes of position on the Greek side, Mardonius launched a full attack. The result of the complex battle was complete victory for the Spartans, under the leadership of Pausanias. Mardonius was killed and the Persians fled in confusion led by Artabazus, the Persian second in command.

The Greek victories at Plataea and contemporaneous naval battle at Mycale brought the invasion of Greece to an end. The Persian Empire would never again launch an attack on mainland Greece. Following these victories, Athens established itself as the head of the Delian League, reaching its height under the leadership of Pericles.

=== Dedication ===
After describing the Greek victory at Plataea, in 479 BC, Herodotus recounts the collection of rich spoils, by the Helots, (the Spartan underclass), who had taken part in the battle, and then records the decision of the Greek cities to dedicate an offering to Apollo at Delphi:

Having brought all the loot together, they set apart a tithe for the god of Delphi. From this was made and dedicated that tripod which rests upon the bronze three-headed serpent, nearest to the altar.

— Herodotus Histories 9.81.1

The bronze column consisting of three intertwined snakes, was intended to commemorate the 31 Greek city-states that participated in the battle. A golden tripod topped the column, made by Persian weapons, and the whole monument was dedicated to the god Apollo and was placed next to the altar of Apollo at Delphi.

In the same chapter, Herodotus records that dedications were also made to Zeus at Olympia and to Poseidon at the Isthmus. It is significant that precedence was given to Apollo at Delphi, despite the ambiguities in the responses of the Delphic oracle about the outcome of the invasion, and a suspicion that Delphi was sympathetic to the Persians.

=== Pausanias' inscription ===
Pausanias, full of arrogance over his victory at Plataea and the subsequent ease with which he punished the Theban leaders for their support of the Persians, ordered a dedication on the column ascribing victory to himself alone. Later, it was discovered he had been in negotiations with the Persians and the Helots of Sparta to stage a rebellion, and set himself up as Tyrant. Although his treachery was, at first, disbelieved in Sparta, it was eventually confirmed by the Ephors of Sparta through his personal slave, and he was killed. Thucydides describes the Spartan suspicion that Pausanias was at the point of committing treason and going over to the Persians, citing the Serpentine column affair as evidence. Pausanias provided other causes for suspicion in his disregard of laws, his admiration of the Persians, and his dissatisfaction with the status-quo. Upon examination of the rest of his behaviour, the Spartans recalled that when the tripod at Delphi was first erected, Pausanias had thought fit, of his own accord, to have a diptych engraved upon it with the inscription:

‘Pausanias, commander-in-chief of the Greeks,
when he had destroyed the army of the Medes,
dedicated this memorial to Phoebus (Apollo).’

The Lacedaemonians, at once, removed the diptych from the tripod and engraved the names of the cities, who had joined together against the Persians and set up the offering.

Pseudo-Demosthenes gives a significantly different account of the train of events. In a speech, "Against Neaira", the orator recalls the conduct of Pausanias after the defeat of the Persians in the battle of Plataea over the Serpentine column: "Pausanias, King of the Lacedaemonians, caused a diptych to be inscribed on the tripod at Delphi, [which those Greeks, who had fought as allies in the battle of Plataea and in the naval engagement at Salamis had together made from the spoils taken from the Barbarians and had set up in honour of Apollo as a memorial to their bravery], as follows: 'Pausanias, commander-in-chief of the Greeks, when he had destroyed the army of the Medes dedicated this memorial to Phoebus (Apollo)', as if the work and the offering were his alone, and not from the allies together. The Greeks were enraged and the Plataeans obtained leave to bring a suit, on behalf of the allies, against the Lacedaemonians for 1,000 talents at the Amphictyonic council; (Note: The Amphictyonic Council was a meeting of 12 city states with responsibility over the sanctuary at Delphi.) and they compelled the Lacedaemonians to erase the inscription and inscribe the names of those cities which had shared in the work".

The orator goes on to argue that this action rankled the Lacedaemonians and was a strong motive, 50 years later, in their influencing the Theban night attack on Plataea in 431 BC, which was the first action in the Peloponnesian War described in Thucydides book 2.

Diodorus Siculus, writing in the 1st century BC, says that a couplet composed by the poet Simonides, replaced Pausanias’ haughty personal dedication:

The saviours of Greece at large dedicated this,
having delivered the cities from wretched servitude.

=== Classical and Roman history ===
In the second century AD, Pausanias, the travel writer, noticed the monument at Delphi: "The Greeks together, from the spoils taken at the battle of Plataea, dedicated a gold tripod set on a bronze serpent. The bronze part of the offering was preserved there, even at my time, but the Phocian leaders did not leave the gold in place in the same way." The Phocian General Philomelus took the treasures in 354 BC to pay for mercenaries during the Third Sacred War, an act of extreme sacrilege, which resulted in the expulsion of Phocians from the Amphictyonic league, by Philip II of Macedon, and to the imposition on them of a fine of 400 talents.

Even at the time of Pausanias’ visit, the Sacred Way, leading up to the temple of Apollo, was lined on both sides with monuments, statues and treasuries commemorating important events in Greek History. "Closest to the altar", as Herodotus says, was the Serpentine column, the base of which has been found, as has the base of the altar, which was dedicated by the Chians. Above these loomed the great bronze statue of Apollo, and, on the architrave of the temple, shields commemorating a Greek victory over the Gauls. Pausanias also mentions the offering to Zeus at Olympia, [paragraph above] and listed the names of the cities engraved upon it.

=== Byzantine history ===
Constantine the Great moved the Serpent Column to Constantinople to decorate the spina (central line) of the Hippodrome of Constantinople, where it still stands today.

According to W. W. How and J. Wells, it was converted into a triple-mouthed fountain by a later Emperor, and was seen and described by travellers from 1422 onwards.

Many Ottoman miniatures show the serpent heads were intact in the early decades following the Turkish conquest of the city.

=== Ottoman period ===
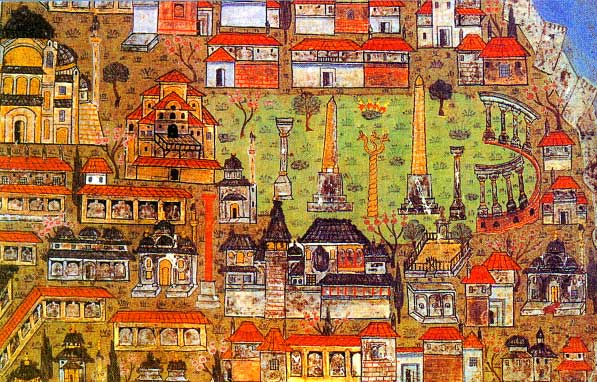
Depiction of the Hippodrome in 1536, by the Ottoman miniaturist Matrakci Nasuh

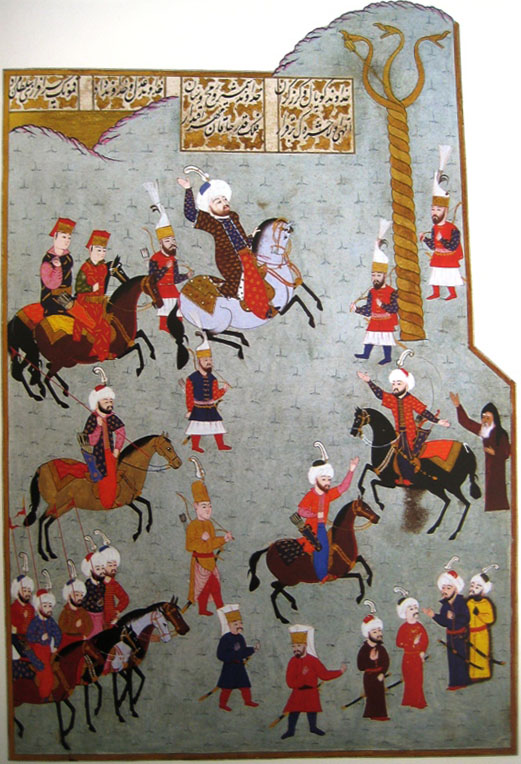
The text of the Hünername, written in the 1580s, claims that Patriarch Gennadios visited Mehmed II to tell him that if he damaged the Serpent Column the city would be infested with snakes, and a miniature was painted showing the patriarch giving this warning as the sultan throws his mace at a jaw." Miniature from the Hünername.

Ahmed Bican, from Gallipoli, gave a short description of the Column in his Dürr-i Meknûn, written around the time of the Fall of Constantinople. He states that it is a hollow bronze of intertwined snakes, three-headed, a talisman for the citizens against snake bites.

Between fifty and one hundred years after the Turkish conquest of Constantinople, the jaw of one of the three serpent heads was documented missing. The accepted version states that Mehmed II shattered it upon entering the city in triumph as its conqueror. Edward Gibbon recounts a version of this event:

The conqueror gazed in satisfaction and wonder on the strange though splendid appearance of the domes and palaces, so dissimilar from the style of Oriental architecture. In the hippodrome, his eye was attracted by the twisted column of the three serpents, and, as a trial of his strength, he shattered with his iron mace or battleaxe the under-jaw of one of these monsters, which in the eyes of the Turks were the idols or talismans of the city.

Other Ottoman writers attributed the lost jaw to Selim II, Suleiman II or Murad IV, all said to have struck off the jaw to show their strength.

The column is quite extensively described along with a dissertation about its history by Petrus Gyllius, who visited Constantinople in 1550. He made no mention about any damage of the column. The column is then described by Pietro Della Valle, who visited Constantinople in 1614. Again, there was no mention about damages, but he reports the folkloristic tale about the column as a talisman.

Later, at the end of the 17th century, all three of the serpent heads were destroyed. Silahdar Findiklili Mehmed Aga relates in Nusretname ("The Book of Victories") that the heads simply fell off on the night of October 20, 1700. The upper jaw of one of the heads is on display at the Istanbul Archaeology Museum.

== Excavation ==
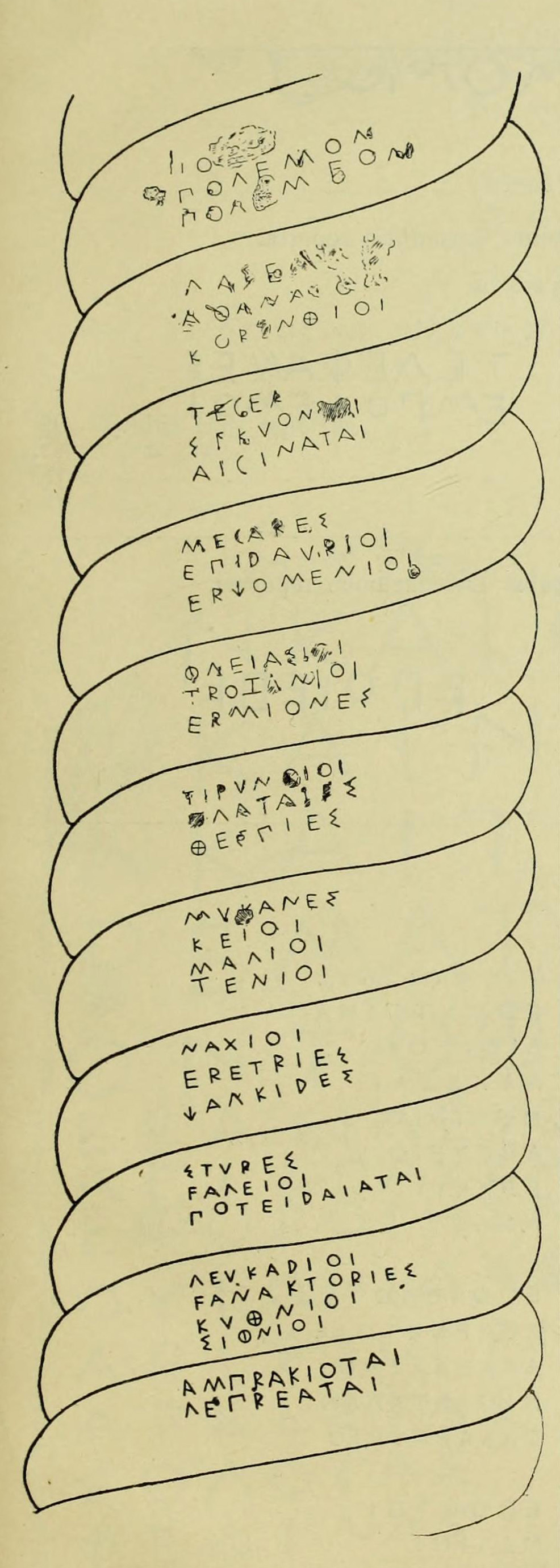
Drawing of the inscriptions, 1907

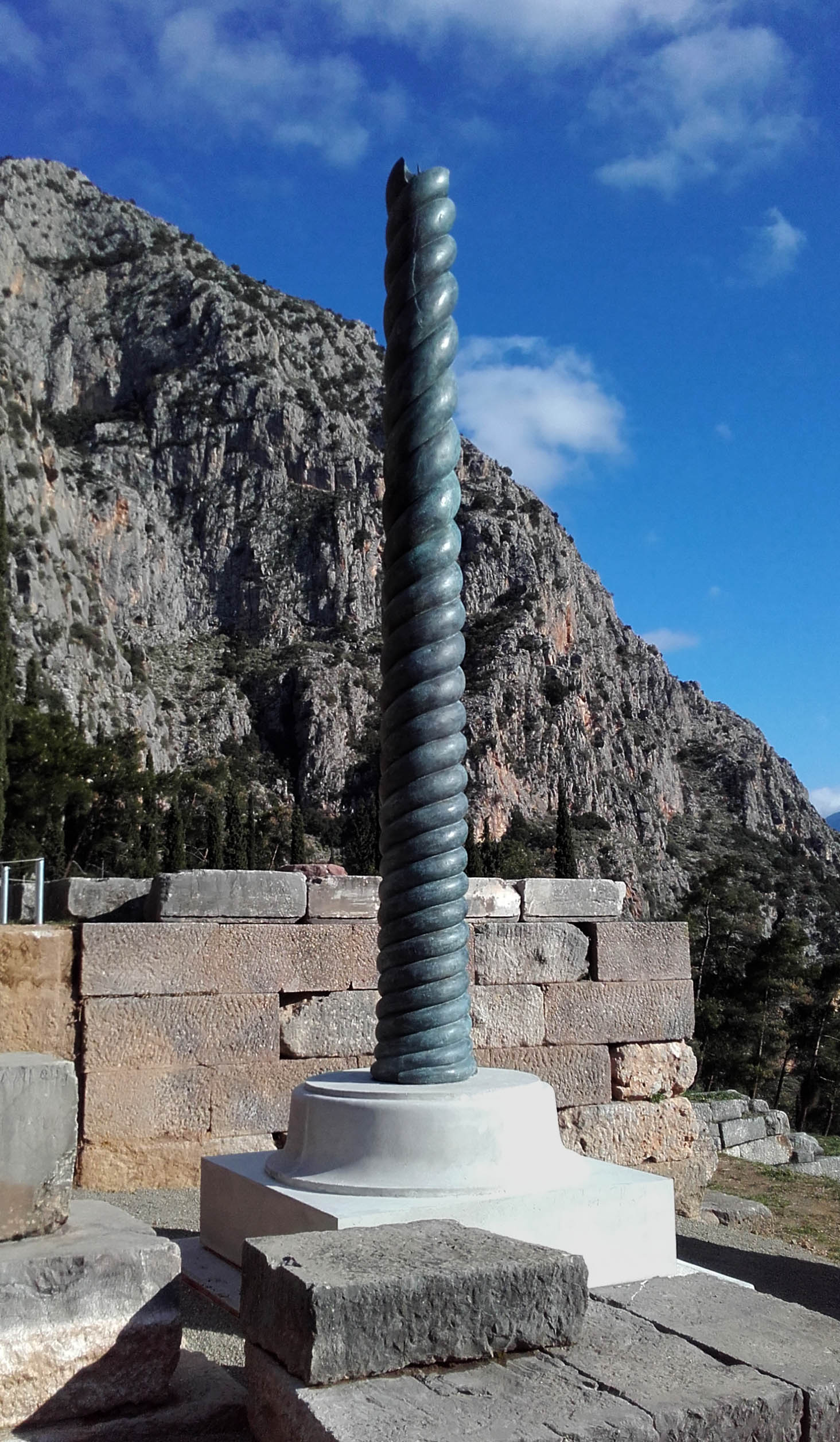
Replica of the Serpent Column erected at Delphi, 2015

Marcus N. Tod says the level of the ground was raised in 1630, and the inscribed portion of the monument was then hidden. The base of the column was excavated in 1855, under the supervision of Charles Thomas Newton. Fifteen of the serpents’ coils had been hidden and the inscription, beginning at the 13th coil and ending at the 3rd was revealed. It was deciphered by C. Frick in 1856, by Ernst Fabricius in 1886 and by others since.

The 13th coil carries the Laconic inscription:

"Those who fought the war", followed on coils 12 to 3 by the names of 31 city states. This contains eight cities not named in Herodotus, book 9.28 as being present at the battle of Plataea, and excludes Pale, in Cephalonia, which Herodotus did include. In the aforementioned paragraph Pausanias lists the names on the offering to Zeus at Olympia, which exclude four cities inscribed on the Serpentine column. Perhaps this is a simple oversight by a copyist. Although the cities inscribed on the column exclude other cities mentioned by Herodotus as participating in the war, it is clear that the memorial relates to the Great Persian War as a whole, not just the battle of Plataea. Coils 12 and 13 have been scarred and dented by sabre cuts, which made the inscriptions difficult to decipher. The dedication, said by Diodorus to have been composed by Simonides, has not been found. One of the serpent heads survives in the Museum of Antiquities, Istanbul. This head has its under-jaw missing, in line with the story of Mehmet II striking it off.

In 2015 a bronze cast copy of the serpent column was made and set up in the Archaeological Site of Delphi.

== Inscription ==
On the coils of the column, an inscription was written that mentioned the Greek city states that had fought the war. They are more or less arranged according to the number of soldiers and/or money they had contributed to the force that had assembled at Plataea.

Greek City States Who Fought at Plataea
Coil	State	Number of Men
Twelfth coil	Lacedaemonians	10,000
	Athenians	8,000
	Corinthians	5,000
Eleventh coil	Tegeans	1,500
	Sicyonians	3,000
	Aeginetans	500
Tenth coil	Megarians	3,000
	Epidaurians	700
	Orchomenians	600
Ninth coil	Phliasians	1,000
	Troezenians	1,000
	Hermionians	300
Eighth coil	Tirynthians	200?
	Plataeans	600
	Thespians	1,800
Seventh coil	Mycenaeans	200?
	Ceans	-
	Melians	-
	Tenians	-
Sixth coil	Naxians	-
	Eretrians	300?
	Chalcidians	400
Fifth coil	Styrians	300?
	Eleans	-
	Potideaeans	300
Fourth coil	Leucadians	400?
	Anactorians	400?
	Cythnians	-
	Siphnians	-
Third coil	Ambraciots	500
	Lepreans	200

Herodotus adds the Styreans, Mantineans, Crotoniats, Cephalonians, Lemnians, and Seriphians.

== See also ==
- Delian League
- Ionian Revolt
- Iron pillar of Delhi
- List of public art in Istanbul
- Nehushtan
- Pausanias (general)
- Pericles
- Serpent (symbolism)
- Xerxes I of Persia

== Sources ==
=== Ancient sources ===
- Herodotus (1920). The Histories. with an English translation by A. D. Godley. Cambridge: Harvard University Press. At the Perseus Project of Tufts University.
- Diodorus Siculus (1967). Library. in Twelve Volumes with an English Translation by C. H. Oldfather. Cambridge, Mass.; London. At the Perseus Project of Tufts University.

=== Modern sources ===
- Gyllius, P. (1729). The antiquities of Constantinople: with a description of its situation, the conveniencies of its port, its publick buildings, the statuary, sculpture, architecture, and other curiosities of that city: with cuts explaining the chief of them: in four books. London.
- della Valle, P. (1843). Viaggi di Pietro della Valle, il pellegrino: descritti da lui medesimo in lettere familiari all'erudito suo amico Mario Schipano, divisi in tre parti cioè: La Truchia, La Persia, e l'India, colla vita dell'autore. Brighton: G. Gancia.
- Menage, V.L. (1964). "The Serpent Column in Ottoman Sources". Anatolian Studies. 14. Anatolian Studies, Vol. 14: 169–73. doi:10.2307/3642472. JSTOR 3642472. S2CID 191577344.
