= Aja'ib al-Makhluqat =

Seminal work on cosmography

The Wonders of Creatures
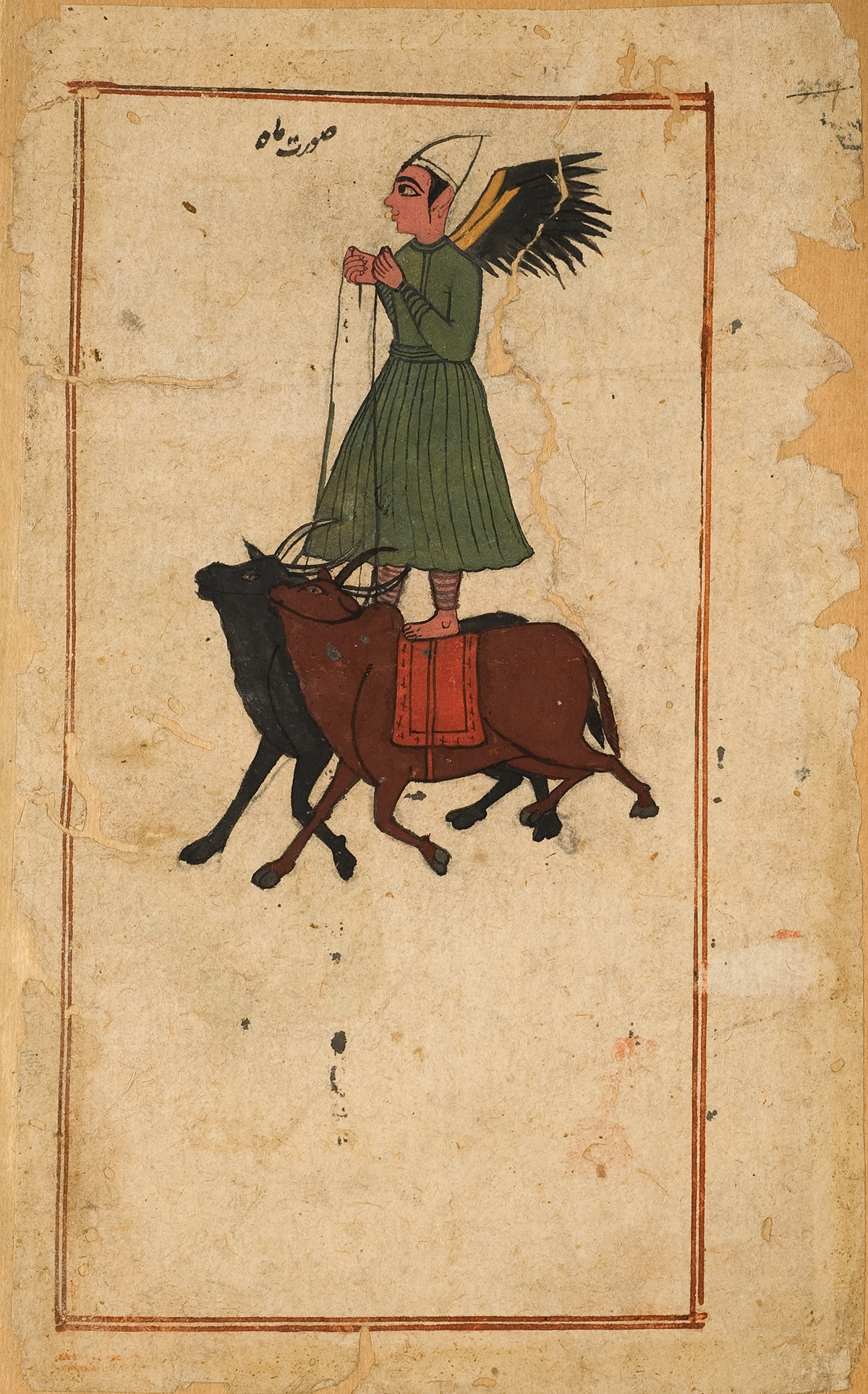
- An illustration depicting the moon in al-Qazwini's work, The Wonders of Creation. Copy was made in 1537/944, probably in western India.
- Author: Zakariya al-Qazwini
- Original title: عجائب المخلوقات وغرائب الموجودات
- Language: Arabic
- Genre: Cosmography
- Published: 1280
- Publication place: Persia

Aja'ib al-Makhluqat wa Ghara'ib al-Mawjudat (Arabic: عجائب المخلوقات وغرائب الموجودات) or The Wonders of Creatures and the Marvels of Creation is an important work of paradoxography and cosmography by Zakariya al-Qazwini, who was born in Qazwin in 1203 shortly before the Mongol invasion of the Khwarazmian Empire.

== Background to the work ==
Qazwini's Aja'ib al-Makhluqat was criticized for being less than original. Substantial parts of his work are derivative of Yaqut al-Hamawi's Mu'jam al-Buldan.

Qazwini mentions fifty names as his sources, the most important of whom are old geographers and historians such as Istakhri, Ahmad ibn Fadlan, al-Masudi, Ibn Hawqal, al-Biruni, Ibn al-Athir, al-Maqdisi, and al-Razi. Even though Qazwini's work is a compilation of known and unknown sources, it influenced later works of Islamic cosmology and Islamic geography through its style and language. Qazwini's cosmography is not pure science but was intended to entertain its readers by enriching scientific explanations with stories and poetry.

== Framework ==
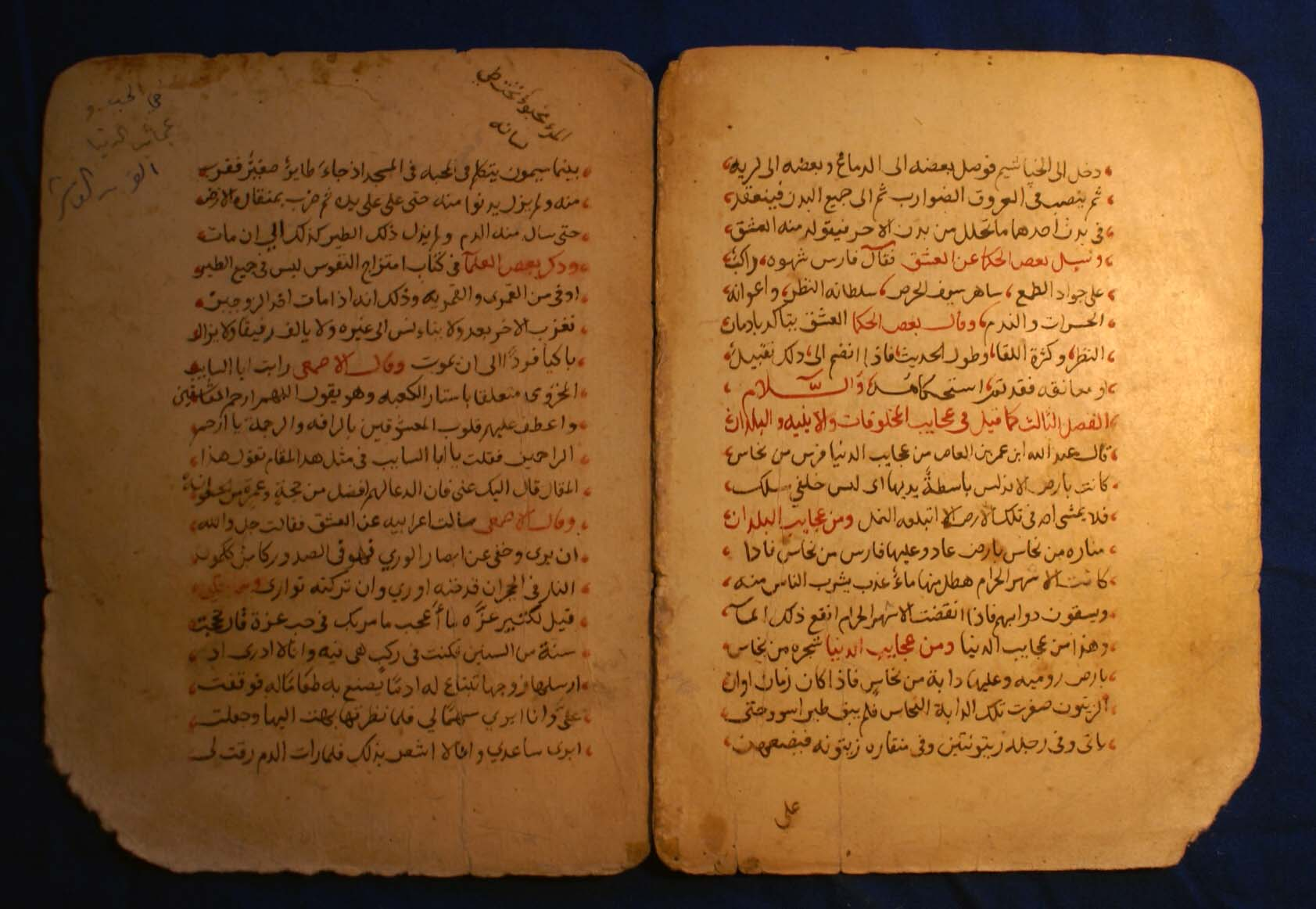
A manuscript of the treatise copied in the 14th century

Qazwini's cosmography consists of two parts, the first part is celestial, dealing with the spheres of the heaven with its inhabitants, the angels, and chronology. Astronomical knowledge of that time is compiled together with astrological ideas.

The second part discusses the terrestrial: the classical elements, the seven climes, seas and rivers, a sort of bestiary on the animal kingdom (including mankind and the jinns), the plants, and minerals. He discusses here humanity and the faculties of his soul, his character, weaknesses, and illnesses.

The cosmography of Aḥmad al-Ṭūsī (Note: Also Aḥmad-e Ṭūsī, or Aḥmad-ī Ṭūsī.)) is very similar and bears the same title; though the latter is characterized by tawhid and the unity of creation..

== Celestial cosmography ==
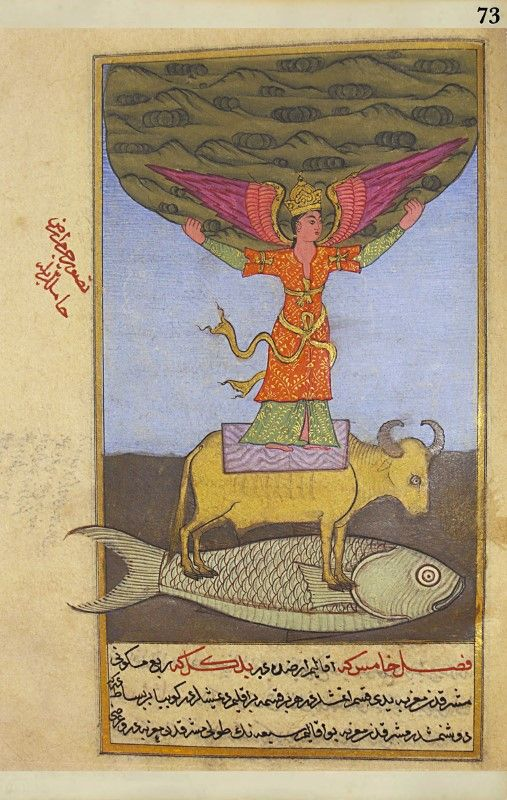
The fish (Bahamut) carries on its back the giant bull (Kuyuta), and on the green hyacinth slab stands an earth-bearing angel. —Surüri's Turkish translation of al-Qazwini. Topkapi Palace Museum, Istanbul, MSSA A 3632, folio 131a

Qazwini says that the earth was swinging in all directions until God created an angel to bear it on his shoulders and steady it with his hands. A green jacinth slab was placed underneath the angel, the slab borne by a gigantic bull Kujata, (Note: "الصخرة أن تدخل تحت قدمي الملك ثم لم يكن للصخرة قرار فخلق الله تعالى ثورا عظيما يقال له كيوثاء (..the rock to under the feet of the malak (angel), and as the rock was not steady, God created a great bull called Kuyūthā)") which in turn rested on the giant fish Bahamut. (Note: A thesis by Chalyan-Daffner (2013) transcribes the bull's name in the Wüstenfeld edition as "Kīyūbān/Kibūthān", but it has been pointed out that this may be in a "corrupt Arabic form". Hermann Ethé translated it as "Leviathan".)

Qazwini's cosmography above has been compared to a similar entry in Yaqut al-Hamawi's Mu'jam al-Buldan and ibn al-Wardi's Kharīdat al-'Ajā'ib, with minor differences noted.

=== Time ===
When discussing time, Qazwini makes the parallel comparison of the Islamic, Roman and Iranian calendars. Thus he links the days of the week to the sacred history of Judaism, Christianity, and Islam, e.g. the holy days Friday (the day of congregational prayer in Islam), Saturday (the Shabbat in Judaism) and Sunday (the day of rest in Christianity) and how they came to be regarded as holy. The days are also linked to lawful and unlawful things and acts.

=== Angelology ===
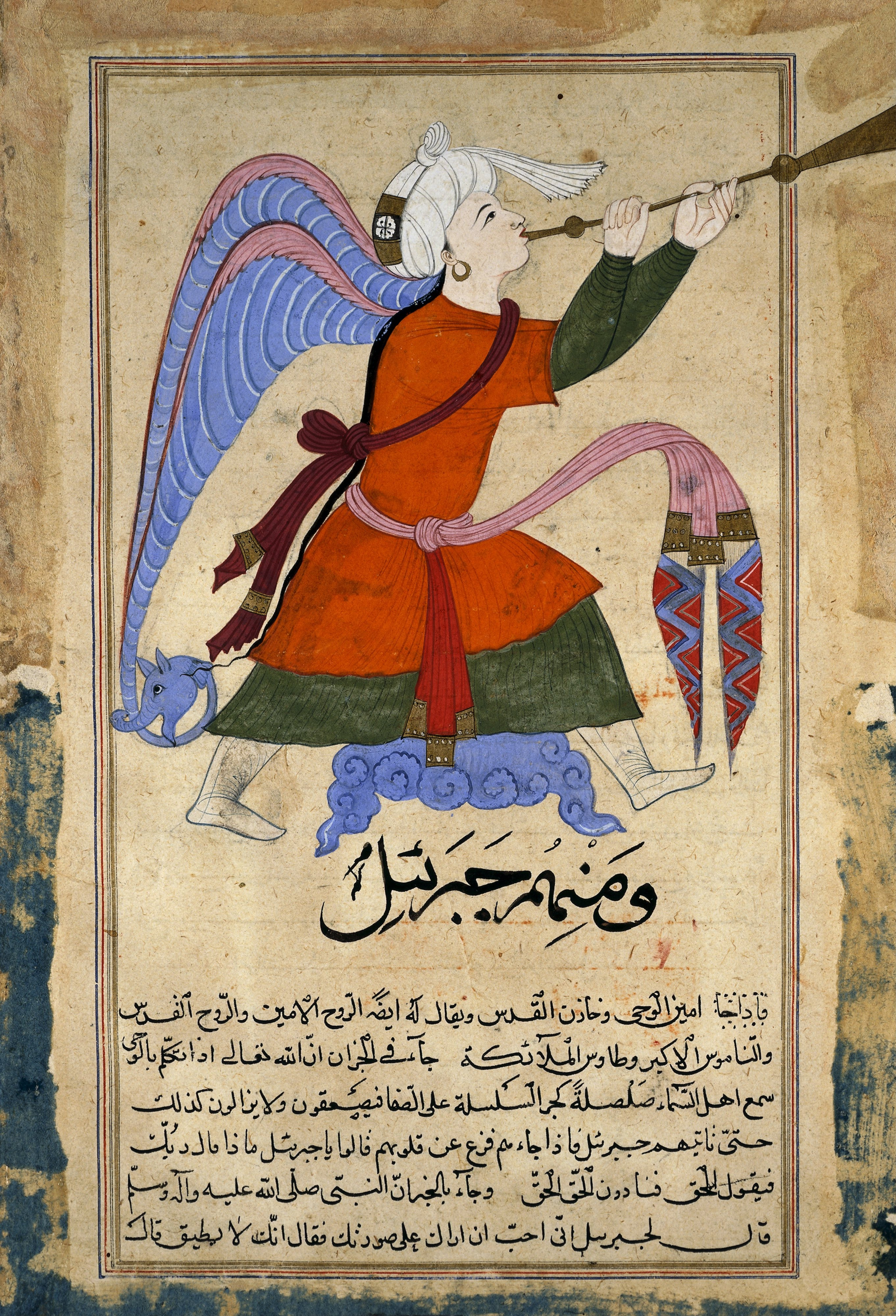
An illustration from the manuscript depicting the angel Israfil on the Day of Judgement. Baghdad, Jalayirid period; 1375–1425 CE

Qazwini shows that God created many things that are unknown to the people (Quran 16:8), and a fundamental part of this, with central importance, is God's Throne, His footstool are the angels and the jinn. For some Muslims, the footstool is the eighth and the Throne the ninth sphere. Furthermore, the Throne of God is the qibla for inhabitants of the celestial spheres like the Kaaba is for people on earth.

The angels inhabit the celestial spheres. The angels are good, perfect beings without negative feelings or passion; they are obedient, and most importantly, they keep the order of the creation and govern everything on earth; the jinn and devils are flawed and imperfect creatures who possess passion and wrath and are disobedient. Qazwini's work contains moreover angelology that has roots partly in the Quran and hadith.

There are two types of angels in the Quran, the one being the guards of hell (96:18) and angels that are nearest to God (4:170, 83:21). Qazwini also mentions the angels who carry the Throne of God (the idea goes back to the Jahiliyya): they are four in number in the form of a man, bull, eagle and lion. On the Day of Resurrection, the Throne will be carried by "eight" (Quran, Ḥāqqa 69:17), and this traditionally refers to eight angels. Next to these is the angel ar-Ruh or the Spirit, who is first in order and the greatest. His breath quickens the creatures, and he knows the order of the spheres, planets, elements, minerals, etc. He is the one who decides the movement and stillness of things by the will of God. This angel is followed by Israfil; he transmits the orders of God and blows the horn. He is not mentioned in the Quran but in hadith and linked to the Day of Resurrection. Israfil carries the tablet (lawh) and the pen (qalam). Whether the abovementioned angels or Gabriel, Michael or others, all of them have a role in keeping the order of the creation. It is also believed that angels have about seventy wings each. God then sent angels to inhabit the earth. One sent in exile was young Azazil, educated by the angels. He acquired their knowledge and became like them and even their leader. He fell into disgrace because he disobeyed God; he would not prostrate himself before Adam as the vicegerent of God on earth. The idea of Azazil comes from Judaism and is mentioned in the Quran (Baqara 2:32, etc.) as Iblis. In folk Islam, Iblis is believed to be present in baths, bazaars, crossroads, and intoxicating drinks and is associated with flutes, poetry, tattoos, lies and illnesses.

God also persecuted and imprisoned many of the jinn and exiled them. Jinn and ghouls are then considered terrestrial beings, occupying a place between animals and humanity, and discussed in the second part of Al-qazwini's work.

== Terrestrial cosmography ==
The earth, being part of the lower spheres, brings forth minerals, plants, and living creatures such as animals and humans. In Qazwini's classification, there are seven types of living creatures: man, jinn, animals used for riding, animals that graze, beasts, birds, and insects—and creatures that look strange or are hybrids.

=== Man ===
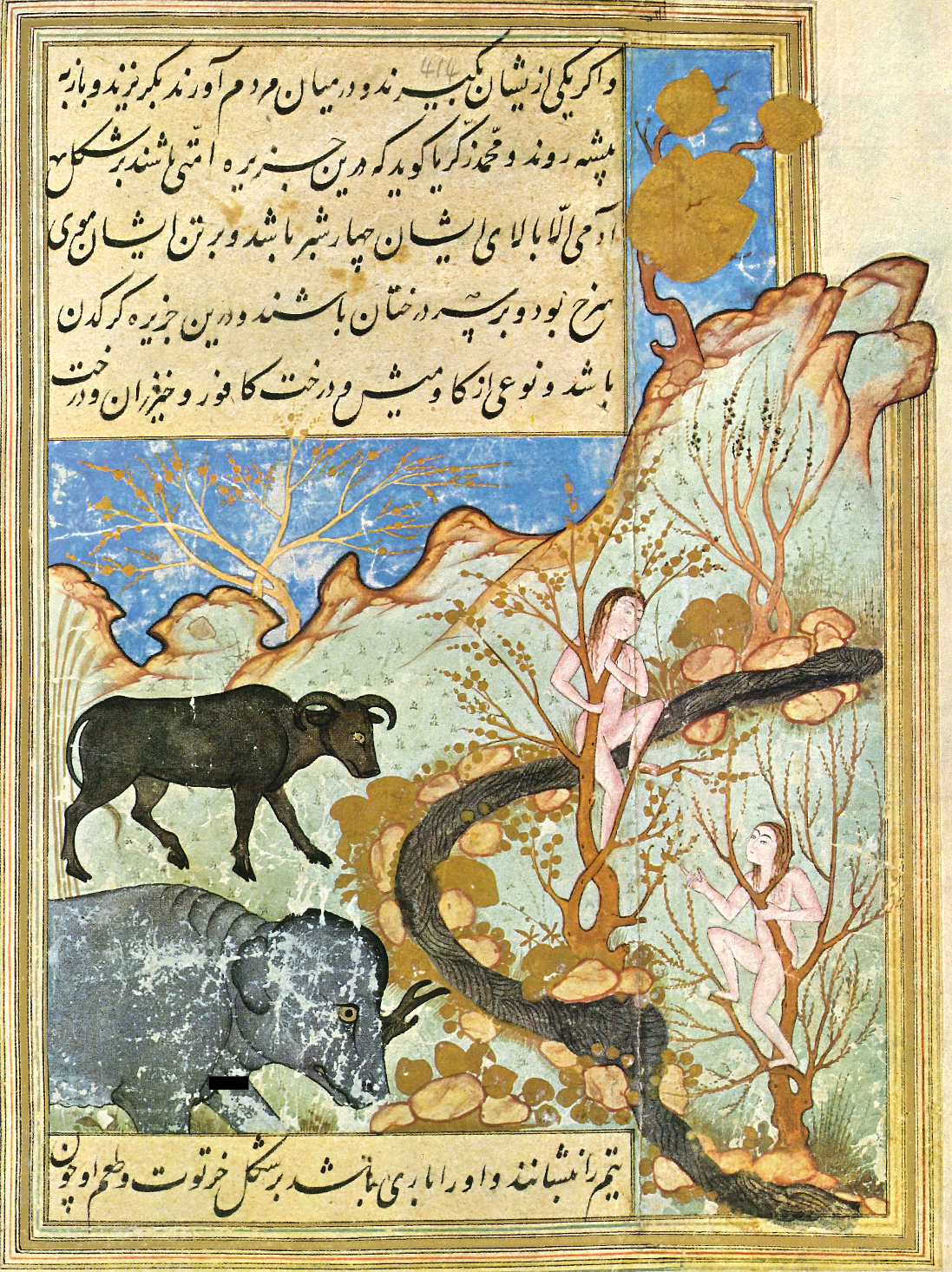
Page featuring humans and other creatures, painted in Shiraz around 1545

Humanity has the highest rank in the order of God's creation (macrocosm): he is its quintessence (microcosm) and can be both the embodiment of the angels and Satan. Humanity has a rational soul and can think, talk, and choose to ascend to the highest or lowest stations in life. Man's soul is immortal, and he is created for immortality; he changes his place of living from the womb to the earth and from there to paradise or hellfire.

Next to man are the jinn, created from smokeless fire and can be in different forms. It is also believed that the jinn represent the rebellious among men or that angels were created from the light of the fire and the devils or jinn from its smoke. According to a legend, the jinn were created before Adam and lived on the land, sea, plains and mountains and God's mercy for them was boundless. They had a government, prophets, religion and laws, but they became disobedient and stubborn and broke the rules of the prophets, which culminated in chaos on earth. Solomon became their lord whom they obeyed. Ya’juj and Ma’juj (Gog and Magog) dwell in the seventh clime, according to Qazwini in another work (Ātar al-balad). Traditionally Islam assigns their homeland between the fifth and seventh climes.

=== Bestiary ===
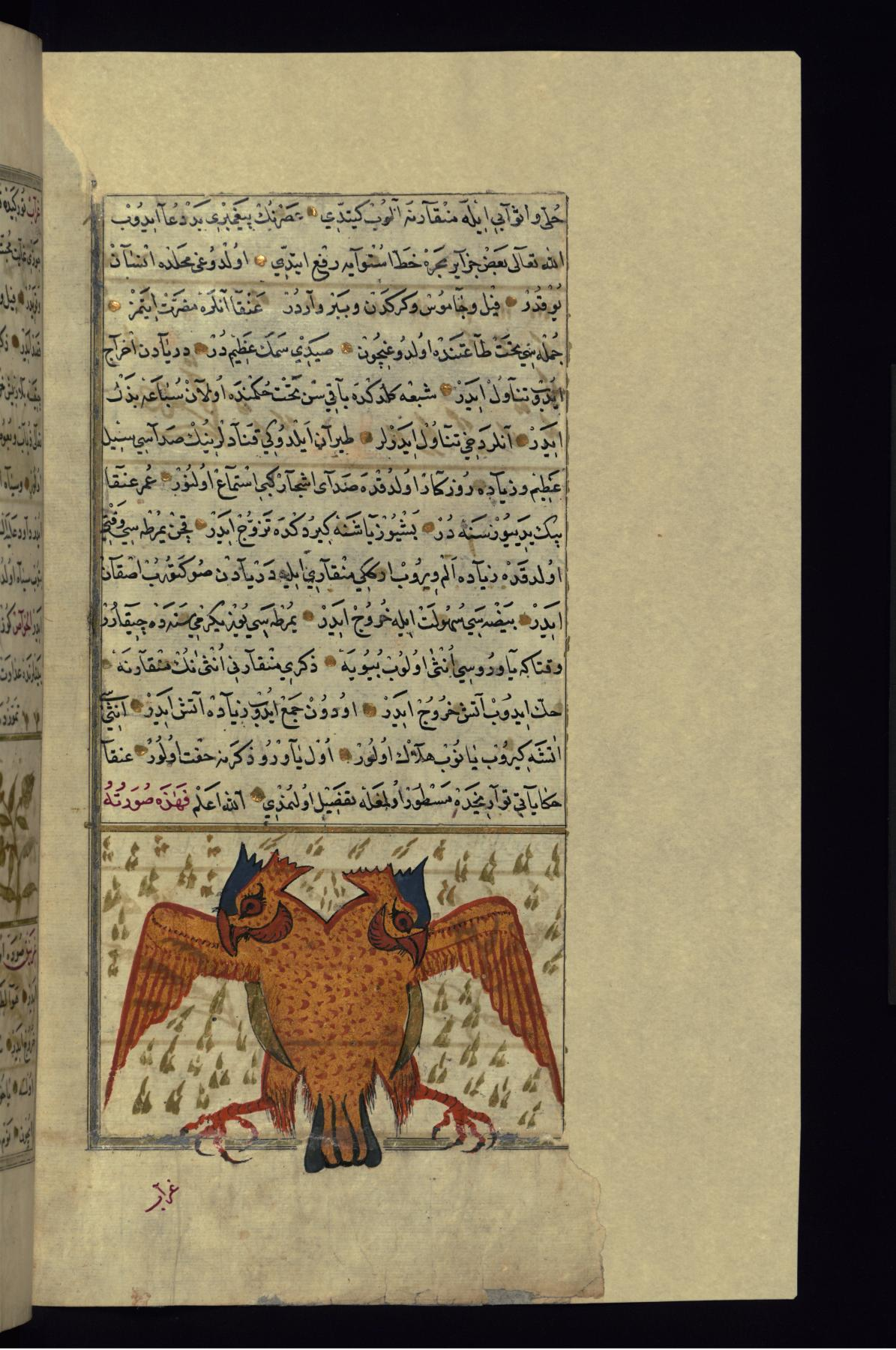
A depiction of an Anqa, 1717 CE, Ottoman Empire

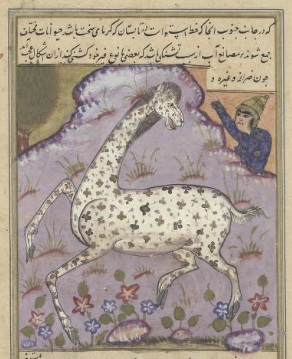
Giraffe illustration in Zakariya al-Qazwini: Aja'ib al-Makhluqat, 1602, Leiden University Libraries manuscript.

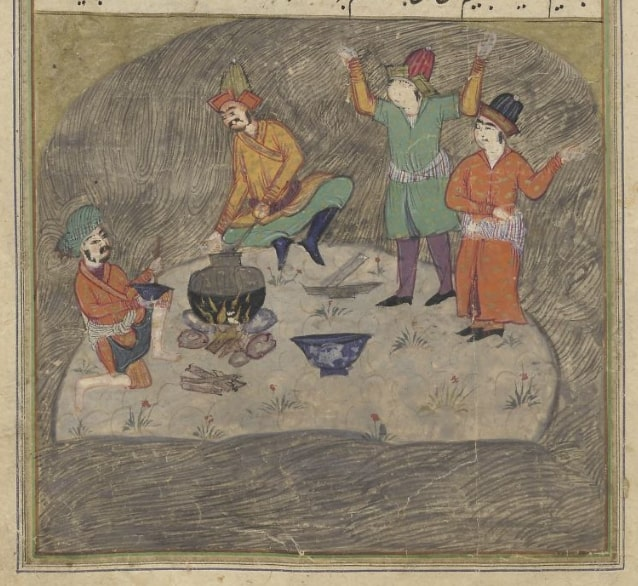
A huge sea turtle as a small island inhabited by sailors. Aja'ib al-Makhluqat, 1602, Leiden University Libraries MS.

God created the birds because He knew that many people would deny the existence of flying creatures, especially the angels. Furthermore, Qazwini adds as proof that God created birds with three wings, as He did the unicorn, the Indian ass with a horn or the bat without wings; why not angels? Among the birds, Qazwini classifies the Anqa or Simurgh (Phoenix) as the most known bird and the kin of birds that lived alone on Mount Qaf. This idea goes as back as to the time of Zoroaster. In more recent traditions, the Anqa is a wise bird with experience gained throughout many ages and gives warnings and moral advice.

This bird lived without procreation long before Adam was created; he was single and the first and most powerful bird. The "golden age" of the Simurgh was the time of Solomon in which not only ministers were near his throne but also animals and birds with whom Solomon could speak; the Anqa also talked to him and was the most respected. The second bird that is also recurring in classical Persian literature and mentioned by Qazwini is the Homa (paradise bird). When it lands on someone's head, that person becomes the king of his land. A bird used in Iranian mystical symbolism is the salamander or "firebird", which was not seen since the time of Muhammad. Qazwini talks about the hoopoe, which has a central role in Iranian mysticism, only in passing; here, it is described as being able to see water from afar but not the mesh that is in front of its eyes.

So the hoopoe symbolizes fate: when it comes, human eyes are blinded, i.e. a human cannot predict his fate. Another exceptional bird in Qazwini's list is the eagle because lions feared it, and from his wings, fire appears. Birds that were conceived as strange hybrids by Qazwini are the vulture, having the claws of the rooster, or the ostrich with the feet of a camel and the body of a bird; this bird eats stones and flames and can live in fire for ten years. He can also digest the legs of a horse and birds but not date pits. The ostrich fears his own shadow and always walks against the sun. There are also other rare and strange birds, for example, a giant bird in Khuzistan that attacks camels and elephants and has eggs similar to crystal; the "purple bird," a white bird that sits on a rock in the Chinese Sea and the person that looks at that rock must laugh to death, except that this bird lands on the rock; or a bird in Tabaristan which is seen in spring and carries one hundred sparrows on its tail and eats one each day.

Qazwini discusses theories of the subsequent mating of animals of several species to produce the giraffe, which sports the spotted skin of a leopard, the sloping back of a hyena and also resembles a camel and a cow. Mythical creatures are also treated, such as the huge sea turtle which sailors take to be a small island, and the sea crab, "a strange animal looking like five snakes with a head".

=== Lapidary ===
Some stones are associated to jinn or are a remedy against ailments: the emerald cures illnesses and repels devils; a stone called the "talk" is used for amulets and magic drinks; amber was first discovered by Iblis; Alexander the Great used the faylaq stone to protect his men from devils, according to Aristotle, from whose lapidary Qazwini often quotes, nullifies the influence of magicians and devils and protects from jinn. One stone, the bahta, is described as being found at the edge of the utmost darkness where the sun has no effect, near the cosmic ocean.

== Analysis ==
Called the "most precious cosmography of the Islamic culture" by Carl Brockelmann, Qazwini's cosmography was one of the most read works in the Islamic world since numerous manuscripts and translations from Arabic into Islamic languages have survived. Scholars presented excerpts of it to Western readers.

In Qazwini's conception, the Universe is the manifestation of the absolute Truth or God. God's command, "Be!" caused all things in the universe to have a place and a reciprocal relationship between themselves. In Islamic tradition, humanity has the task of understanding the wisdom of God's creation as much as possible. God is the ultimate goal of that cosmic structure.

Traditional Islamic sciences are connected with cosmology that has an essential role within the metaphysical system. Whereas cosmology deals with the spiritual side of the universe, cosmography concerns itself with the physical aspect and its processes. Qazwini states that it is essential that humanity exerts itself to investigate the wondrous and wisely conceived creation of God, reflect on it in astonishment, and understand it as much as possible. In this way, humanity will gain delight in this world and the hereafter. Next to this, Qazwini explains important terminology in his book: 1) marvels are a phenomenon that confuses man because he is not able to grasp its cause and effects; 2) creation is everything except God; it is either essential (body, spiritual substance) or accidental (other); 3) the strange is something which is rare and differs from the known and familiar things and causes astonishment; 4) Creation is divided into several things: it has an unknown cause, man cannot grasp it and it is known in its entirety but not in its details (e.g. the celestial spheres).

Moreover, Qazwini informs us in the introduction of his book that he left his home and family to study books because he believed that a man's best companion on earth are books. He marvelled at the wondrous and strange things in God's creation. How perfect a creation it is, as stated in the Quran (50:6). In his explanation of created things in the powerful and vast universe (51:47), he describes the orbit of the sun based on statements of scientists but also quotes a tradition in which the angel Gabriel tells Muhammad that the sun moves forward 500 years or farsakhs (a farsakh is c. 6 km) from the time Muhammad says "No" until the time he says "Yes" one after another.

In Qazwini's view, wondrous things are in the heavens and the earth, as the Quran informs (10:101), and in the seas and at their shores since it was their beginning and end were not clarified; it was part of the unknown world, inhabited with wondrous and strange creatures. Following the Judeo-Islamic tradition, Qazwini confirms that in the beginning, God created one substance, then He melted it and from the smoke became the heaven and the sediments were formed to earth; heaven and earth were first together, and God divided them (Quran 21:31) and He completed his creation in six days. Altogether God made seven heavens and seven earths (Quran 65:12).

Whether known or unknown, every created thing has a sign of divine wisdom within itself and represents the unity of God. Based on Ptolemy's design of the universe, Qazwini talks about 9 spheres in the heaven: the earth, the Moon, Mercury, Venus, the Sun, Mars, Jupiter, Saturn and the Sphere of spheres, which embraces all other spheres and causes day and night; they all have their own orbit. Whereas on the one hand to these and other stars, Qazwini refers to the spheres or plants in scientific terms, on the other hand he supports the effects of the Moon, the North Pole and South Pole on man and animal, such as having the power to cure illnesses, with sayings among people.

Humanity's purpose is to achieve perfection and eschew bad habits and acts. The good character outweighs in this life, and the next; bad character is a sin that can not be forgiven, and through it, hunanity descends to the lowest of the low in hell. A human with a good character is thus angel-like, and a bad character is the feature of the despised Satan—Qazwini's concern here, so to speak, anthropology.

== Later influence ==
Ahmed Bican Yazıcıoğlu reworked Qazwini's cosmology in the Dürr-i Meknûn in the year 1453, providing his Turkish readership with a much abridged version (reduced to c. one-fifth of the original) in plain Turkish prose, with some new materials added. Bican's rendering was later included by Giovanni Battista Donado in his Della Letteratura de Turchi, Venice (1688), in a shortlist of Turkish works he felt merited translation into Italian.
