= Saros Islands =

Islands in Turkey

Native name: Saros Adaları
- Location within Turkey

Geography
- Location: Aegean Sea
- Coordinates: 40°37′N 26°45′E

Administration
- Turkey
- İl (province): Çanakkale Province
- İlçe: Gelibolu

Saros Islands (also called Üçadalar or Eşek Islands) are three small Aegean islands in the Gulf of Saros, Turkey. At 40°37′N 26°45′E they are administratively a part of Gelibolu ilçe (district) of Çanakkale Province. The biggest of the three is Kaşık Island (also called Hedef or Yunus Island) at the west. The middle one is Ortanca (also called Defne Island ) and the smallest one to the east is Böcek Island. The islands are uninhabited and they are controlled by the navy.
