= Ahmed Bican Yazıcıoğlu =

Ottoman author (died c. 1466)

Ahmed Bican Yazıcıoğlu (? – c. 1466) was an Ottoman author most noted for the cosmography Dürr-i Meknûn, the authorship of which is usually attributed to him.

== Biography ==
Little is known of Yazıcıoğlu's life. His earliest biography was written by Mustafa Âlî. Yazıcıoğlu came from a literary family. His father Salih Yazıcı, who moved to Gelibolu (Gallipoli) before Ahmed was born, and Ahmed's older brother Mehmed Yazıcıoğlu were writers before him and are both still well known.

Ahmed Bican Yazıcıoğlu and his brother were pupils of Hacı Bayram-ı Veli who founded the Bayramiyye order. They considered it their dervish duty to spread knowledge among the common people. To accomplish this, they wrote in the language of their people, which was Turkish. Ahmed Bican (Yazıcıoğlu just means scribe's son) translated and compiled literature using original works from the then dominant scholarly language of Arabic. This religious act of translation has preserved important works for later generations and has caused him to become considered one of the most important figures of Ottoman culture. Besides translations, he also wrote some original works of his own. The famous legend about the founding of Istanbul can be traced back to his Dürr-i Meknûn.

Yazıcıoğlu was highly productive as a writer and transcribed a number of popular religious and encyclopedic works. His best known books today are the religious work Envârü’l Âşıkîn and the Dürr-i Meknûn. He was probably able to accomplish these works by his religious lifestyle. His nickname 'Bican', which means the lifeless, refers to his ascetic dervish lifestyle. He was an advocate of religious fasting and foregoing sleep.

The Dürr-i Meknûn approaches the world from the Creation according to cosmographic tradition. Details about the heavenly bodies are followed by tales of ancient peoples, prophecies and divine punishments, discourses on stones, images, medicinal plants, mythical creatures, faraway countries, seas and islands with their bizarre inhabitants such as the cynocephali. The author concludes with a chapter about the terrors that await us at the end of the world, including the Islamic Antichrist: the Dajjal.

== Works ==
- Envârü’l Âşıkîn (unclear: often 1451 is given, sometimes 1446, 1449, etc.)
- Dürr-i Meknûn (year of writing unknown and much disputed)
- Aca'ibu'l Mahlukat (The Wonders of Creation, 1453)
- Kitabü 'l-müntehã al müstehã ala 'l-fusûs (1465),
- Bostãnü 'l-hakã'ik (1466)
- Cevãhirnãme
- Ravhü 'l-ervãh

=== Dürr-i Meknûn ===
A remarkable passage in the Dürr-i Meknûn is Yazıcıoğlu's fulminating against the deer- and spring-worshipping by Ottomans, a heathen cult within the empire. Another important passage in this book is a tale about Kenan (Ken‘an), one of the sons of Nuh (Noah). Kenan refuses to join his father in the Ark, and hopes to survive the Great Flood in a kind of diving bell that he devises himself. God punishes him for his disobedience with a supernatural bladder infection and Ken'an drowns in his urine inside his own contraption.

=== Legend of the Foundation of Constantinople ===
The version of the legend of the Town's foundation as Ottomans and Turks know it was coined by Ahmed Bican. According to this tale, Yanko bin Madyan (the name has its origin in a misspelling and or misreading in the Ottoman Turkish writing of the word ‘Nikomedian’) decided to build the city on a ‘wedge shaped’ plot of land, triangled between two sea arms. To make sure building activities would commence under an auspicious constellation, his astronomers devised a system of poles with bells and cords attached to them to set the army of diggers, masons etc. to work at the same right time. However, a snake snatched by a local stork curled itself around the bird's neck, thus causing it to fall out of the sky against one of the bells, thereby setting on the entire enterprise in the most ominous of hours, that of the planet Mars. Inevitably, the future of the city was to be rife with earthquakes, war and plagues.

This legend, partly a clever reworking of already existing elements in Byzantine tales and of Muslim views on Constantinople reaching from the imperial to the apocalyptic, deeply influenced Ottoman sentiments (quite a few felt the city to be intrinsically alien) and literature on this topic.

The grave monuments in Gelibolu for Ahmed and Mehmed are tourist attractions.
