= The Discarded Image =

1964 book by C. S. Lewis

- 1st edition cover
- Author: C. S. Lewis
- Language: English
- Subject: Literary criticism
- Genre: Non-fiction
- Publisher: Cambridge University Press
- Publication date: 1964
- Publication place: Cambridge, Cambridgeshire, England, United Kingdom
- Media type: hard & paperback
- Pages: 242
- OCLC: 327503

The Discarded Image: An Introduction to Medieval and Renaissance Literature is a non-fiction book by C. S. Lewis. It was his last book and deals with medieval cosmology and the Ptolemaic universe. It portrays the medieval conception of a "model" of the world, which Lewis described as "the medieval synthesis itself, the whole organization of their theology, science and history into a single, complex, harmonious mental model of the universe."

== Synopsis ==
The book includes such concepts as the structure of the medieval universe, the nature of its inhabitants, the notion of a finite universe, ordered and maintained by a celestial hierarchy, and the ideas of nature. At the same time, Lewis takes his reader on a tour of some of the pinnacles of medieval thought (some of them inherited from Classical paganism) that have survived into the modern cultural and theological landscape.

The titles of the chapters are

1. The Medieval Situation
2. Reservations
3. Selected Materials: The Classical Period
4. Selected Materials: The Seminal Period
5. The Heavens
6. The "Longaevi"
7. Earth and Her Inhabitants
8. The Influence of the Model

=== "The Medieval Situation" and "Reservations" ===
Lewis begins by introducing the Middle Ages as a whole and by laying out the components that shaped their world view. This worldview, or "Model of the Universe", was shaped by two factors in particular: "the essentially bookish character of their culture, and their intense love of system". The bookish character combines with the need for order: "All the apparent contradictions must be harmonised. A Model must be built which will get everything in without a clash; and it can do this only by becoming intricate, by mediating its unity through a great, and finely ordered, multiplicity."

He is quick to point out the possible flaws he feels some may see in his conception. The "Model" is primarily based in art and literature. It does not account for historical changes in philosophic schools or serve as a general history of science or medicine. In addition, only bits and pieces of the Model served as part of the general backdrop of the age. And, above all, Lewis is clear to state that, "On the highest level, then, the Model was recognised as provisional. What we should like to know is how far down the intellectual scale this cautious view extended."

=== "Selected Materials: The Classical Period" ===
Lewis provides summaries of the classical texts he believes most informed the medieval Model. He excludes the Bible, Virgil, and Ovid as texts that a student of medieval literature should already be familiar with. Among the texts he covers are:

- The Somnium Scipionis by Cicero
- The works of Lucan
- Statius' Thebaid
- Apuleius' De Deo Socratis

=== "Selected Materials: The Seminal Period" ===
Lewis refers to the seminal period as a transitional stage stretching from around 205 to 533 A.D. He spends some time discussing the pagans and Christians of this time, and notes that both were monotheists.

As with the Classical period, he provides summaries of various texts, including:

- Chalcidius' commentary on Plato's Timaeus
- Macrobius' commentary on the Somnium Scipionis
- The Celestial Hierarchies of Pseudo-Dionysius
- Boethius' De Consolatione Philosophiae

He also mentions Isidore of Seville's Etymologiae and Vincent of Beauvais' Speculum Majus: "They are not, like those I have been describing, contributors to the Model, but they sometimes supply the handiest evidence as to what it was. Both are encyclopaedists."

=== "The Heavens" ===
"In medieval science the fundamental concept was that of certain sympathies, antipathies, and strivings inherent in the matter itself. Everything has its right place, its home, the region that suits it, and, if not forcibly restrained, moves thither by a sort of homing instinct", a "kindly enclyning" to their '"kindly stede".

In his exploration of the Heavens, Lewis works to explain much of the basics of medieval cosmology. He begins by explaining the phenomenon of "kindly enclyning": everything returns to the place from which it is drawn. Lewis goes on to answer the question that may arise in response to "kindly enclyning" and that is: "[Did] medieval thinkers really believe that what we now call inanimate objects [possess] sentient and purposive [qualities]"? The answer was "in general", no. Lewis says "in general" because "they attributed life and even intelligence to one privileged class of objects (the stars)...But full blown Panpsychism ... was not held by anyone before Camponella (1568–1639)". In support, Lewis describes the "four grades of terrestrial reality: mere existence (as in stones), existence with growth (as in vegetables), existence and growth with sensation (as in beasts), and all these with reason (as in men)". According to Lewis, "To talk as if inanimate bodies had a homing instinct is to bring them no nearer to us than pigeons; to talk as if they could 'obey' laws is to treat them like men and even like citizens". In the medieval conception, everything was made up of the Four Contraries: hot, cold, moist, and dry. These combine to give us the Four Elements: "The union of hot and dry becomes fire; that of hot and moist, air; of cold and moist, water; of cold and dry, earth." There is also a fifth element, aether, that humans do not experience. In the sublunary world, all the elements have sorted themselves out: "Earth, the heaviest, has gathered itself together at the centre. On it lies the lighter water; above that, the still lighter air. Fire, the lightest of all, whenever it was free, has flown up to the circumference of Nature and forms a sphere just below the orbit of the Moon."

He then briefly summarizes the Ptolemaic universe: "The central spherical Earth is surrounded by a series of hollow and transparent globes ... These are the 'spheres', 'heavens' ... Fixed in each of the first seven spheres is one luminous body. Starting from Earth, the order is the Moon, Mercury, Venus, the Sun, Mars, Jupiter and Saturn; the 'seven planets'. Beyond the sphere of Saturn is the Stellatum, to which belong all the stars that we still call 'fixed' because their positions to one another are ... invariable. Beyond the Stellatum there is a sphere called the First Moveable or Primum Mobile ... its existence was inferred to account for the motions of the others."

All motion moved in order from the top to the bottom: from God to the Primum Mobile to the Stellatum to each lower sphere. The spheres also transmitted Influences to the Earth. Here, Lewis takes up the question of astrology in the Middle Ages. He notes that within the Medieval mind the universe was finite, that it was of a perfect spherical shape containing within itself an ordered variety. Lewis states that while a modern mind might gaze into the sky and interpret vast nothingness, a person living within the Middle Ages would be able to admire it as one might admire grand architecture. He concludes that while modern astronomy "may arouse terror, or bewilderment, or vague reverie; the spheres of the old present us with an object in which the mind can rest, overwhelming in its greatness but satisfying in its harmony." He asserts that these observations reveal a key difference between the present and past, that the modern conception of the universe is romantic while the Medieval conception classical. He also goes on to discuss the strange persistence of certain pagan ideas, such as the deification of the planets. He talks about each's influence, metals, and character.

=== "The Longaevi" ===
The Longaevi, or "long-livers", are those creatures which might be called "fairies." Lewis gave them their own chapter because "their place of residence is ambiguous between air and Earth." That is to say, he really couldn't find another section in the book that they'd fit into, so he just gave them their own place. Lewis sees the word fairies as "tarnished by pantomime and bad children's books with worse illustrations." Lewis writes of the various creatures in the Middle Ages: fearsome, fair, and the separate beings known as the High Fairies. He then shares four theories or attempts to fit them into the Model:

1. They could be a third species, distinct from angels and men.
2. They are angels who have been "demoted", so to speak
3. They are the dead, or at least, a special class of the dead
4. They are fallen angels (devils)

"Such were the efforts to find a socket into which the Fairies would fit. No agreement was achieved. As long as the Fairies remained at all they remained evasive."

=== "Earth and Her Inhabitants" ===
In this penultimate chapter, Lewis talks about various facets of Earth, and how they fit into the Model.

==== The Earth ====
Everything below the moon is mutable and subject to the influences of the spheres. While the other planets have Intelligences (deities) associated with them, the Earth was not believed to have one since she did not move and so did not require guidance. Dante was the first to suggest an Intelligence for her: Fortune. "Fortune, to be sure does not steer the Earth through an orbit; she fulfills the office of an Intelligence in the mode proper for a stationary globe."

Despite popular modern conception, the people of the Middle Ages were quite aware that the Earth was spherical. Lewis believes that the misconception may arise from the mappemounde, which represent the Earth as a circle or disc. The purpose of these maps was more romantic than practical, and was not meant to serve the practical purposes of navigation.

==== Beasts ====
In regards to the knowledge of zoology as it appears in the bestiary tradition, Lewis argues that "as there was a practical geography which had nothing to do with the mappemounde, so there was a practical zoology that had nothing to do with the Bestiaries." Lewis sees the bestiaries as an example of encyclopaedic pulling from auctores that he sees as characteristic of the Middle Ages. The focus was on the collection and on the moralitas the animals provided.

==== The Human Soul ====
Speaking of man, Lewis writes: "Man is a rational animal, and therefore a composite being, partly akin to the angels who are rational but ... not animal, and partly akin to the beasts which are animal but not rational. This gives us one of the senses in which he is the 'little world' or microcosm. Every mode of being in the whole universe contributes to him; he is a cross-section of being." The soul of such a creature is likewise a cross-section. There are three kinds of Souls: the Vegetable Soul, the Sensitive Soul, and the Rational Soul. To explain, Lewis writes:

"The powers of Vegetable Soul are nutrition, growth, and propagation. It alone is present in plants. Sensitive Soul, which we find in animals, has these powers but has sentience in addition. ... Rational Soul similarly includes Vegetable and Sensitive, and adds reason."

==== Rational Soul ====
The Rational soul is the third level above the Vegetable and Sensitive Soul. The Vegetable Soul is present in plants and gives the powers of nutrition, growth, and propagation. The Sensitive Soul gives beasts these and the addition of sentience. So we see in the Rational Soul in man, all of the previous abilities with the addition of reason. In other words, man possesses all of the powers of all three soul types or, "though misleadingly", three souls. The Rational Soul exercises two faculties: Intellectus and Ratio. Lewis characterizes the difference thus: "We are enjoying intellectus when we 'just see' a self-evident truth; we are exercising ratio when we proceed step by step to prove a truth which is not self-evident."

==== Sensitive and Vegetable Soul ====
In the Sensitive Soul, Lewis distinguishes ten Senses or Wits, five "inward" and five "outward". Sometimes the outward are simply called "senses" and the inward "wits". The five outward are what are now known as the Five Senses: sight, hearing, smell, taste, and touch. The inward are memory, estimation, imagination, phantasy, and common wit (or common sense).

"There is no need to write a separate section on the Vegetable Soul," Lewis writes. "It is responsible for all the unconscious, involuntary processes in our organism: for growth, secretion, nutrition, and reproduction."

==== Soul and Body ====
Lewis points out two ways in which the problem of the relationship between soul and body would have presented itself to medieval thinkers. First, "How can the soul, conceived as an immaterial substance, act on matter at all?" and second, "'It is not possible to passe from one extreme to another but by a meane.'" He suggests that these considerations led the thinkers to posit "a tertium quid ... [a] phantom liaison-officer between body and soul' [which] was called Spirit or ... (more often) the spirits." These spirits were supposedly material enough to act on the body and "fine and attenuated" enough to be acted upon by the immaterial soul. Lewis adds, "This doctrine of the spirits seems to me the least reputable feature in the Medieval Model. If the tertium quid is matter at all (what have density and rarity to do with it?) both ends of the bridge rest on one side of the chasm; if not, both rest on the other."

==== The Human Body ====
The four contraries, which in the world come together to form elements, combine within the body to create the Humours. The predominance of specific Humours creates specific temperaments: Sanguine, Choleric, Melancholy, and Phlegmatic. "The proportion in which the Humours are blended differs from one man to another and constitutes his complexio or temperamentum, his combination or mixture."

Man is classified into these four categories, based on which temperament is most dominant in him. There is the Sanguine complexion, the best of the four. "The Sanguine man's anger is easily roused but shortlived; he is a trifle peppery, but not sullen or vindictive." Second, there is the Choleric man. "Like the Sanguine, he is easily moved to anger... ...But, unlike the Sanguine, the Choleric are vindictive." Third, there is the Melancholy. "Today I think we should describe the Melancholy as neurotic. I mean, the Melancholy man of the Middle Ages." Finally, there is the Phlegmatic, which Lewis considered to be the worst of the four. "The phlegmatic boy or girl, fat, pale, sluggish, dull, is the despair of parents and teachers; by others, either made a butt or simply unnoticed."

==== The Human Past ====
"Medieval historians ... are a mixed collection. Some of them...have the scientific approach and are critical of their sources." But it is not the accuracy we are after. Rather, it is "the picture of the past". In the Middle Ages, then, the purpose of recording history, or as we know today the term "historiography," was "to entertain our imagination, to gratify our curiosity, and to discharge a debt we owe our ancestors".

"Historically as well as cosmically, medieval man stood at the foot of a stairway: looking up, he felt delighted. The backward, like the upward, glance exhilarated him with a majestic spectacle, and humility was rewarded with the pleasure of admiration."

==== The Seven Liberal Arts ====
The Seven Liberal Arts are Grammar, Dialectic, Rhetoric, Arithmetic, Music, Geometry, and Astronomy. Lewis goes on to write in more detail concerning each art, describing exactly how and why it was so important for a medieval education. "The first three constitute the Trivium or threefold way" and as such are connected to one another in some form. For example, Grammar and Dialectic are a progression. "Having learned from Grammar how to talk, we must learn from Dialectic how to talk sense, argue, to prove and disprove. Rhetoric, prior to the medieval period was "not so much the loveliest as the most practical of the arts. By the middle ages, it has become literary...There is no antithesis, indeed no distinction, between Rhetoric and Poetry".

=== The Influence of the Model ===
Lewis concludes by highlighting the impact the Model had on the literature and art of the era. "Poets and other artists depicted these things because their minds loved to dwell on them. Other ages have not had a Model so universally accepted as theirs, so imaginable and so satisfying to the imagination."

== Selected reviews ==
Most reviews of the book were positive:

- "Wise, illuminating, companionable, it may well come to be seen as Lewis’s best book." The Observer
- "the final memorial to the work of a great scholar and teacher and a wise and noble mind."

However, some reviewers have noted Lewis' "tendency to oversimplify...and to overcategorize".

== See also ==
- The Waning of the Middle Ages
