= Gelibolu =

- Municipality
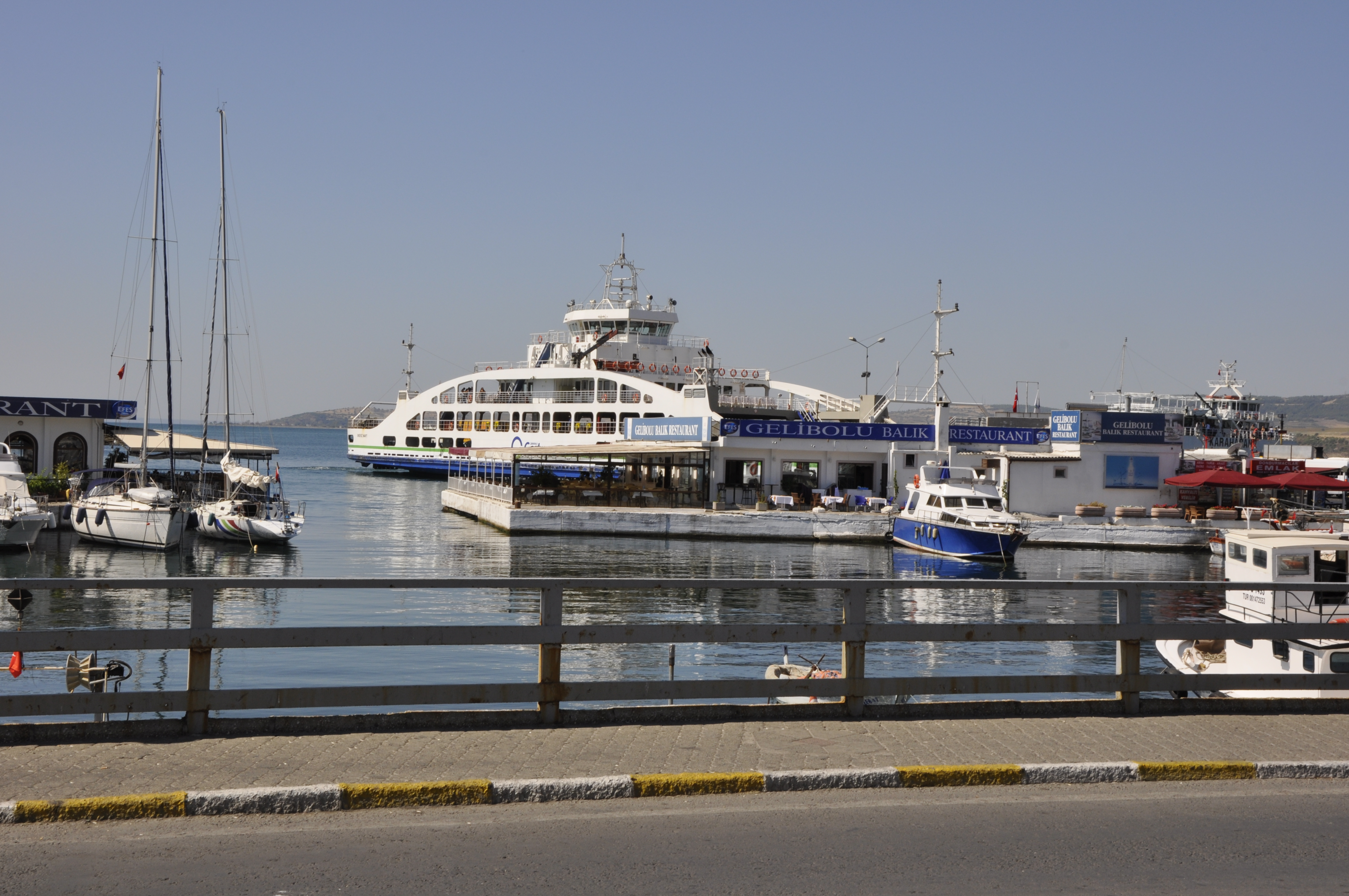
- The port of Gelibolu on the Dardanelles strait

- Logo

- Location within Turkey Location within Marmara
- Coordinates: 40°24′50″N 26°40′13″E
- Country: Turkey
- Province: Çanakkale
- District: Gelibolu

Government
  - Mayor: Ali Kamil Soyuak (AKP)
- Elevation: 0 m (0 ft)
- Population (2021): 31,782
- Time zone: UTC+3 (TRT)
- Postal code: 17500
- Area code: 0286
- Website: www.gelibolu.bel.tr

Gelibolu is a town in Çanakkale Province of the Marmara region, located in Eastern Thrace in the European part of Turkey. It is located on the southern shore of the peninsula named after it on the Dardanelles strait, 3 kilometres (1.9 mi) away from Lapseki on the other shore. It is the seat of Gelibolu District. Its population is 31,782 (2021).

== History ==
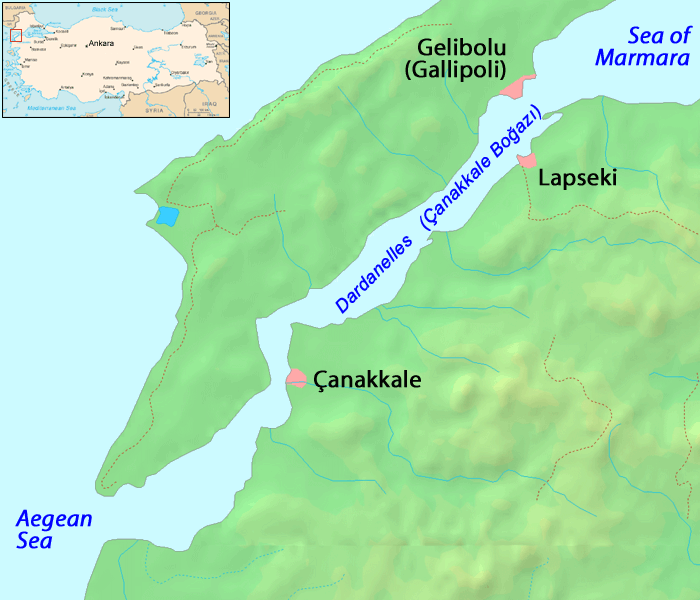
Map of the Dardanelles strait, where Çanakkale, Lapseki and Gelibolu are located.

The Macedonian city of Kallipolis was founded in the 5th century B.C. It has a rich history as a naval base for various rulers.

The emperor Justinian I fortified Gallipoli and established important military warehouses for corn and wine there, of which some Byzantine ruins can still be seen. After the capture of Constantinople by the Latins in 1204, Gallipoli passed into the power of the Republic of Venice. In 1294 the Genoese defeated a Venetian force in the neighbourhood. The Catalan Company, a body of Almogavars, under Roger de Flor, established themselves here in 1306, and after the death of their leader massacred almost all the citizens; they were vainly besieged by the allied troops of Venice and the Byzantine Empire, and withdrew in 1307, after dismantling the fortifications. After the city's defenses were damaged in an earthquake, it was conquered by Turks in 1354 and became the first stronghold of the Ottoman Empire in Europe. Sultan Bayezid I (1389–1403) built a castle and tower there which can still be seen. In 1416 the Venetians under Pietro Loredan defeated the Turks here. Gallipoli is the site of "tombs of the Thracian kings", which refers to the graves of the Islamic writers Ahmed Bican (died 1466) and his brother Mehmed Bican (died 1451).

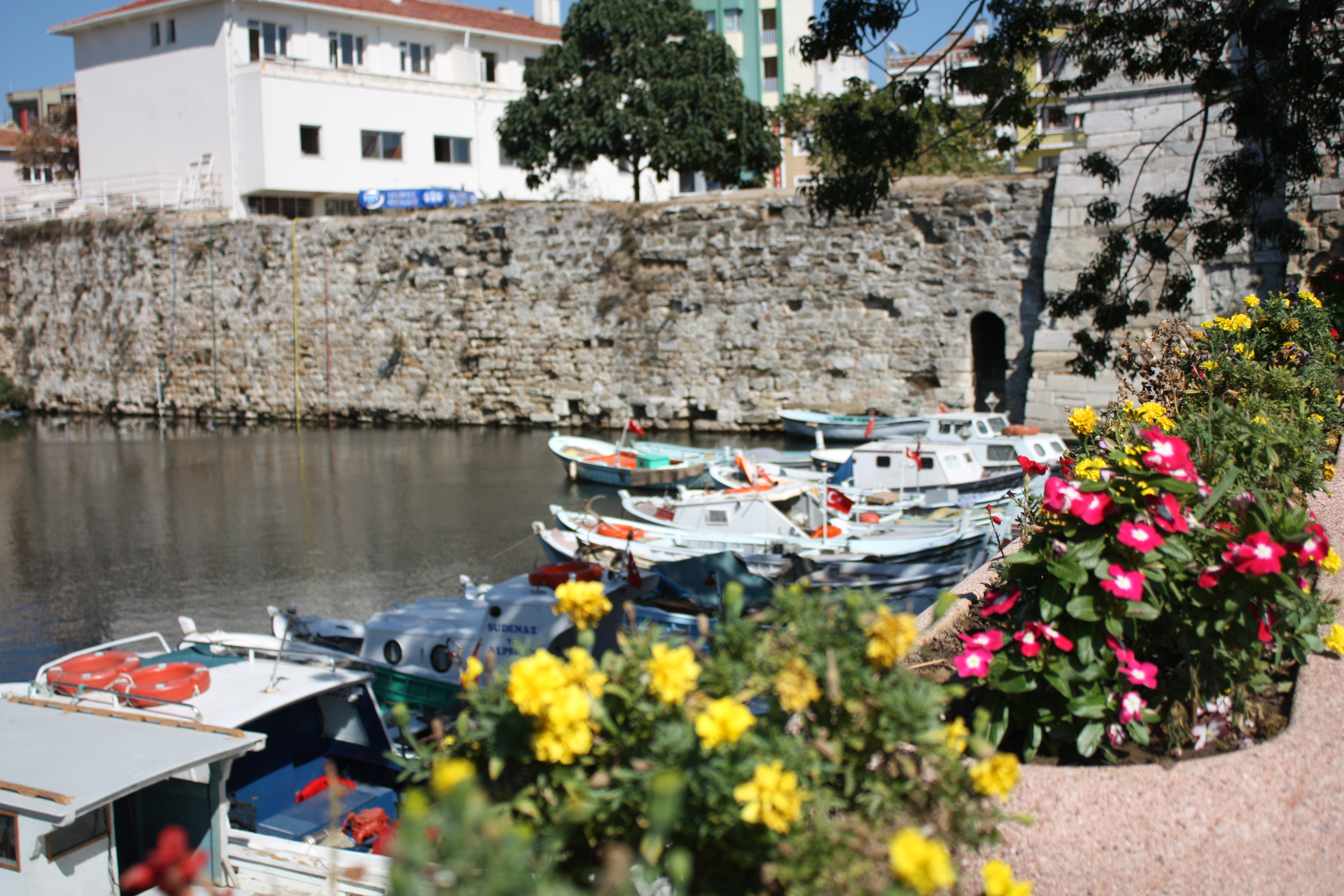
A view from the port of Gelibolu

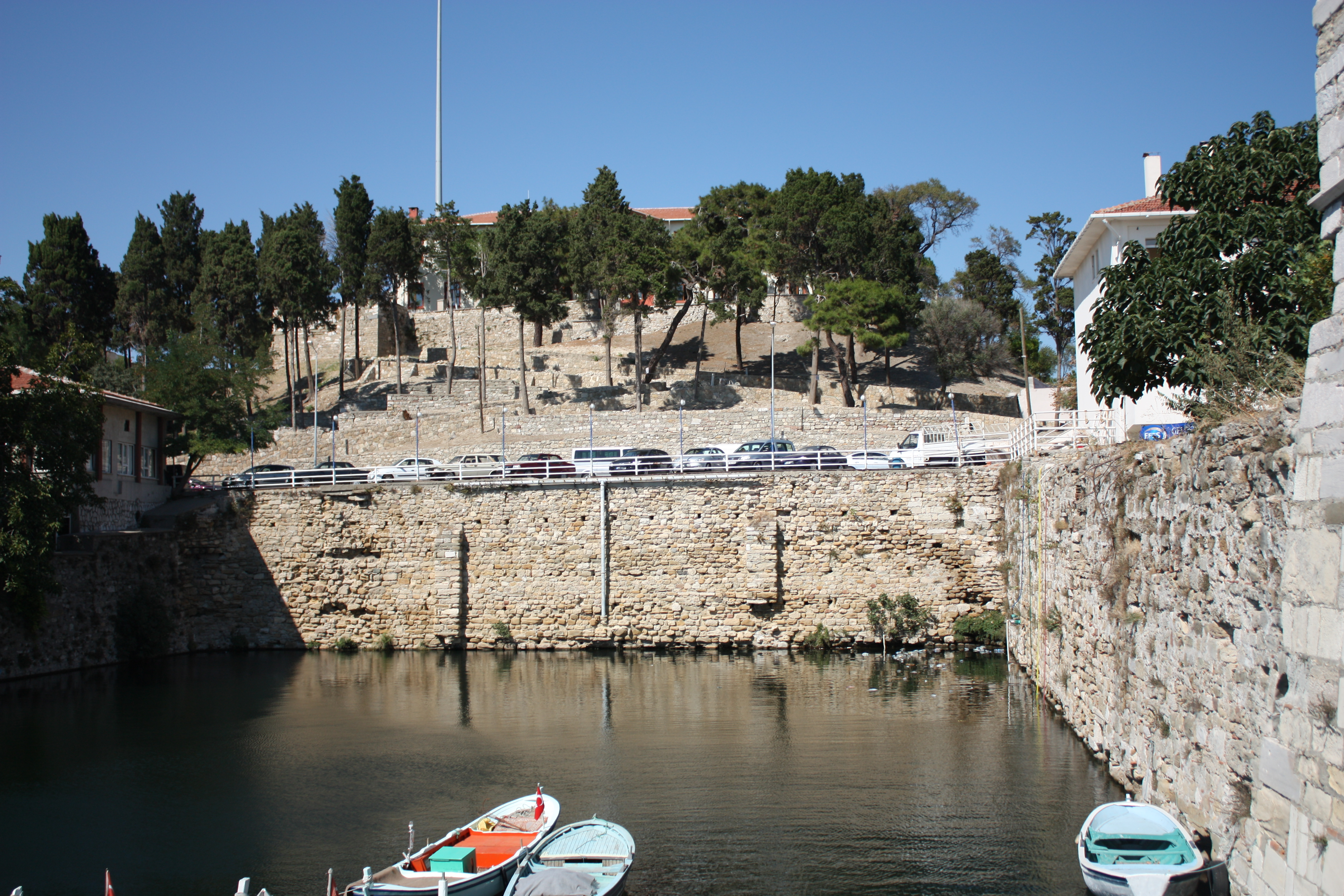
Historic buildings near the port

Throughout the Ottoman period, the town was the capital of the Sanjak of Gelibolu, and the original center of the Eyalet of the Kapudan Pasha; between 1864 and 1920 the town belonged to the Edirne Vilayet of the Ottoman Empire. In 1904 the Greek bishopric of Kallipolis was promoted to a metropolis and is listed under the Ecumenical Patriarchate of Constantinople.

From the early 17th century until the early 20th century, a relatively large number of Sephardic Jews lived in Gallipoli, descendants of those fleeing the Spanish Inquisition.

In 1854 the town was occupied by the allied French and British armies during the Crimean War who strengthened the defensive constructions from 1357. Many soldiers died there of cholera and are buried in a local cemetery. The guns of Gallipoli guarded the sea of Marmara until 1878 when more fortifications were built when the Russians threatened to take possession of Constantinople.

The Bulgarian Army threatened Gelibolu during the First Balkan War and advanced to Bolayır in 1912. During the First World War the peninsula and the town were witness to a series of memorable battles (see Gallipoli Campaign). The town was occupied by the Greek army in 1920–1922, and finally returned to Turkey in 1923 under the Treaty of Lausanne. Like the island Imbros off the western shore of the peninsula, Gallipoli had had a majority of Greek inhabitants from ancient times until World War I. It was exempted in article 2 from the Convention Concerning the Exchange of Greek and Turkish Populations (1923), however, the Greek inhabitants were expelled or killed during the Turkish War of Independence. Between 1922 and 1926 the town was a provincial center and the districts of Gelibolu, Eceabat, Keşan (Enez became part of Keşan before 1953) and Şarköy.

== Bishopric ==
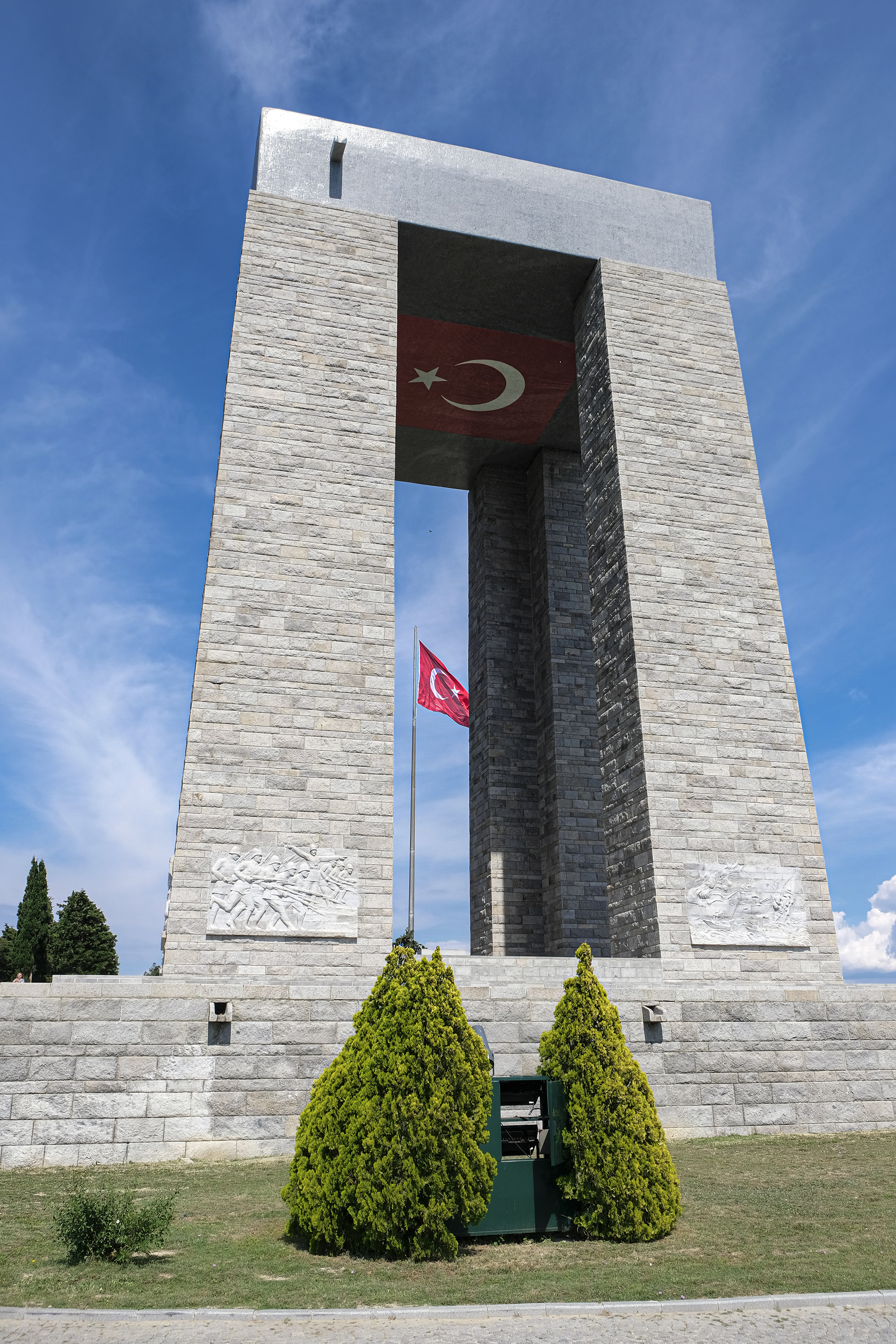
Gallipoli National Park

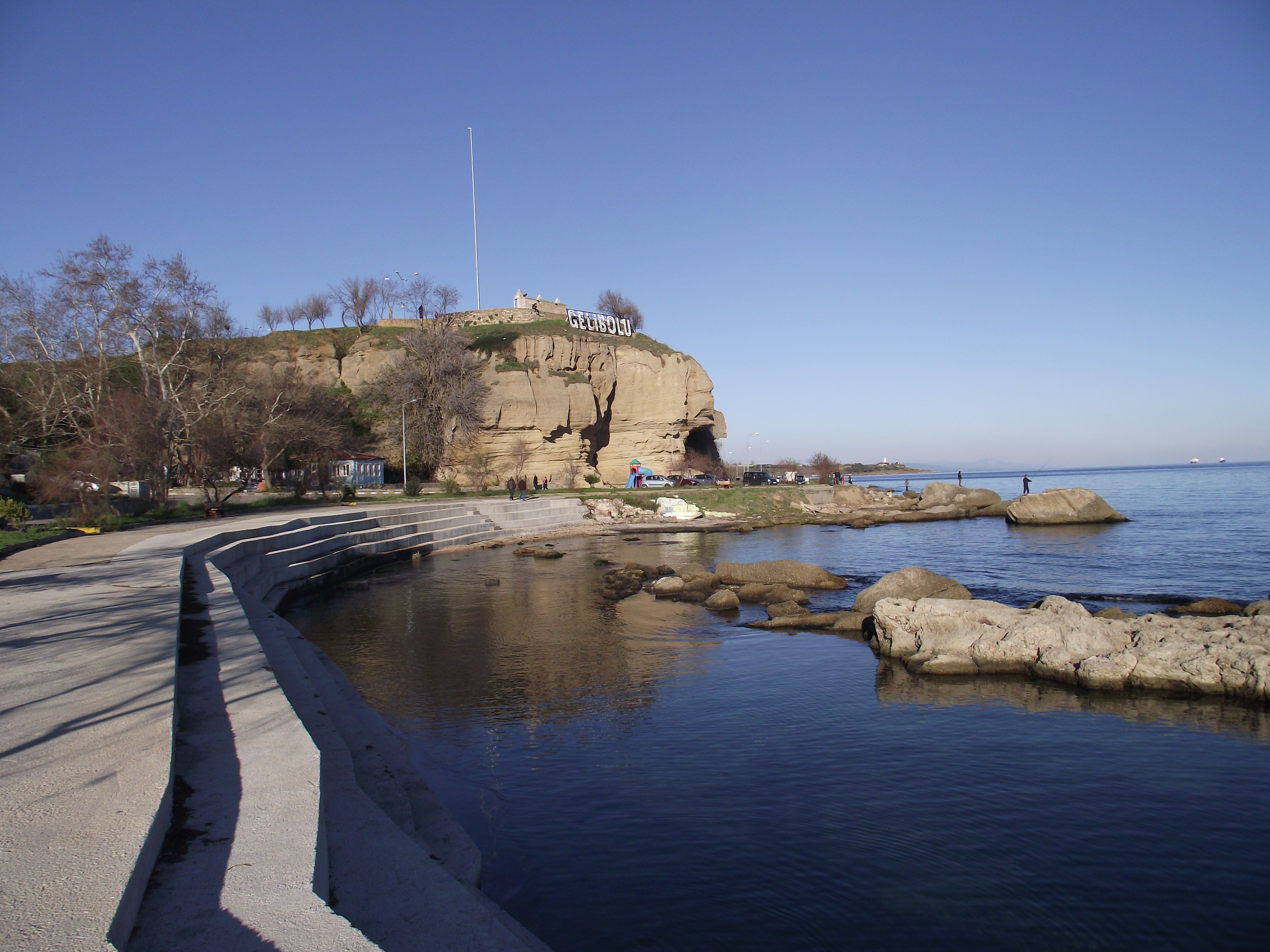
The coastal promenade of Gelibolu near the lighthouse

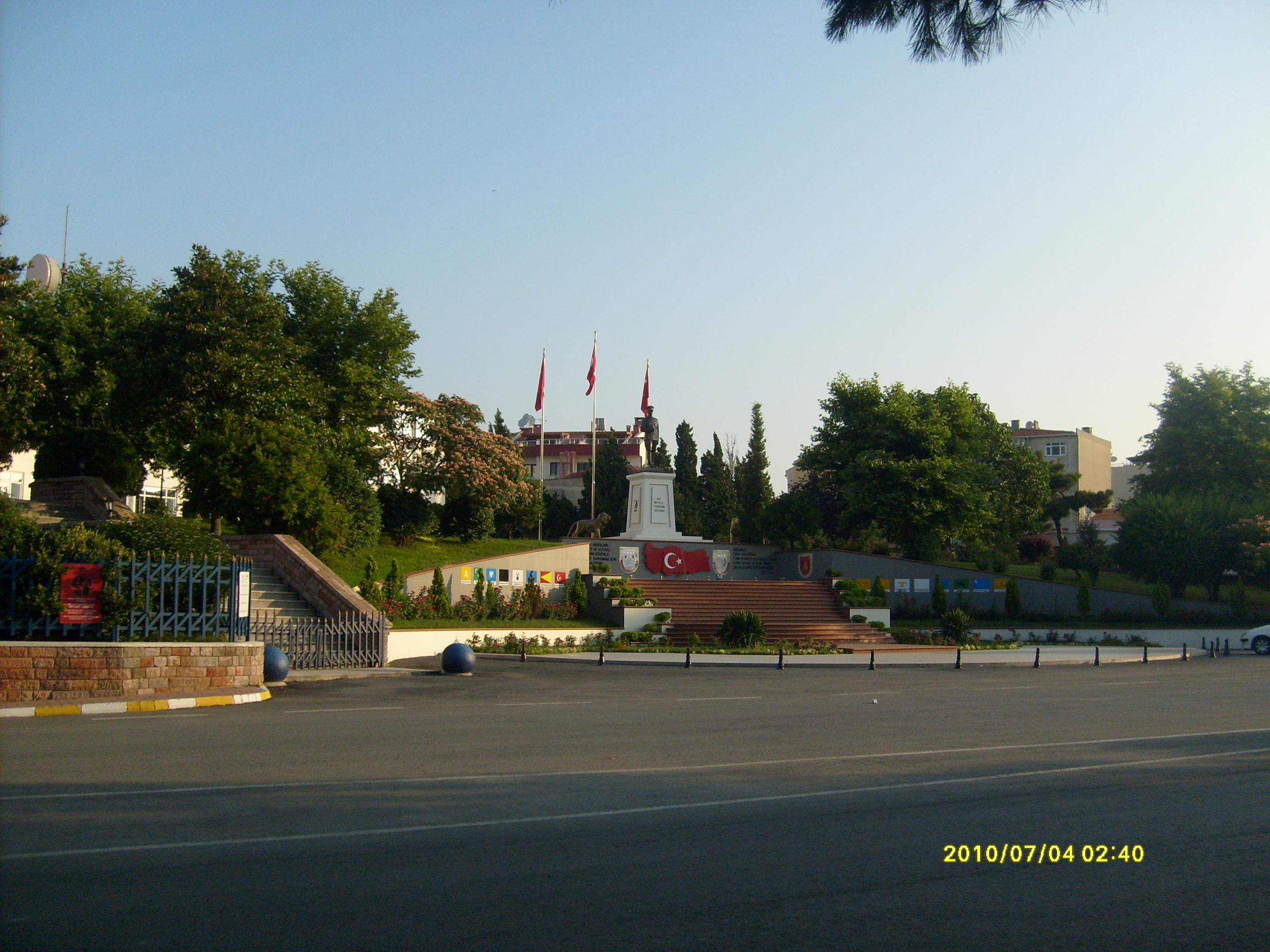
Statue of Atatürk in Gelibolu

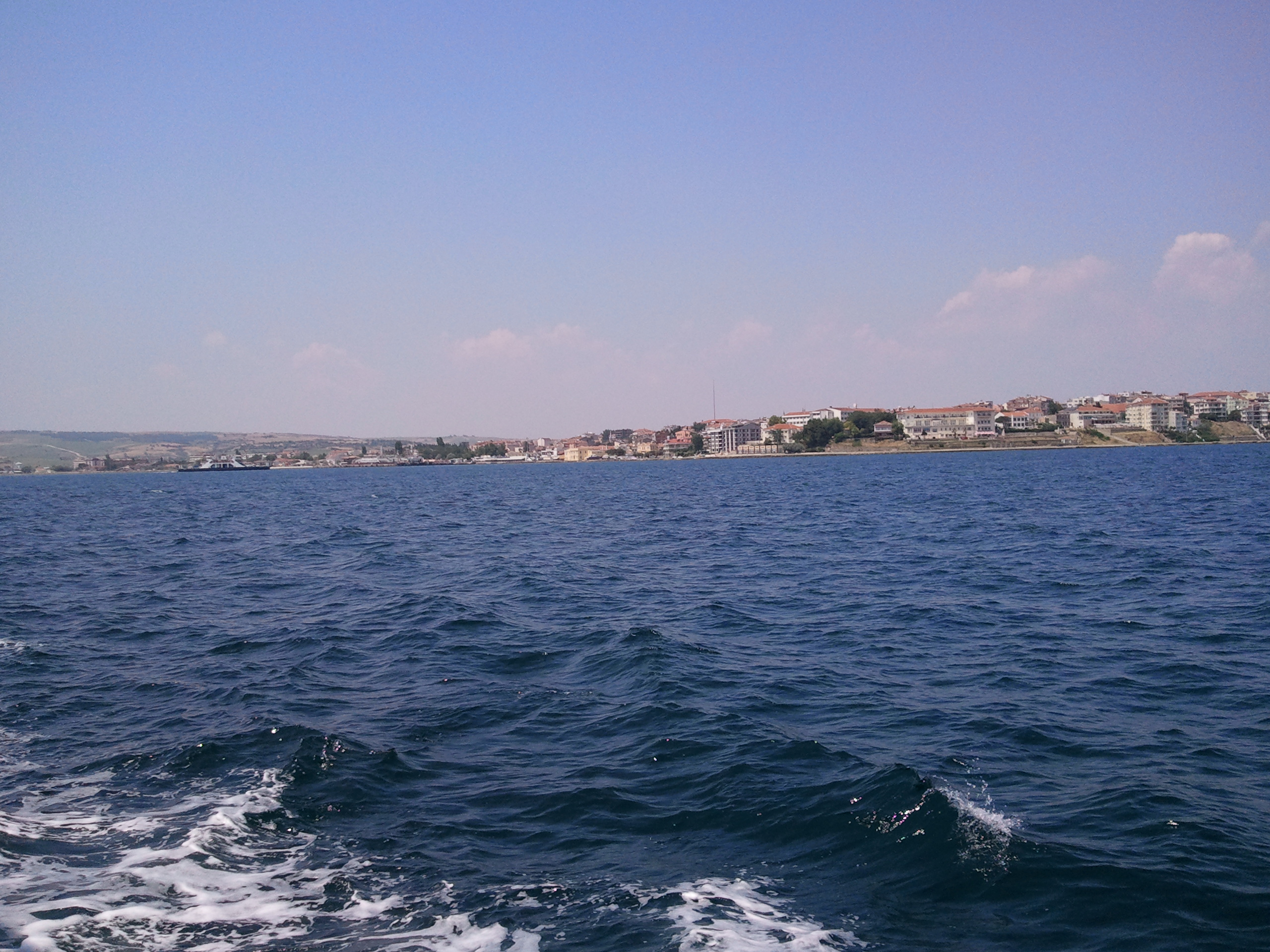
View of Gelibolu from the sea

A Christian bishopric, a suffragan of Heraclea, the capital and metropolitan see of the Roman province of Europa. Extant documents give the names of three of its bishops of the period before the East–West Schism: Cyrillus, who was at the Council of Ephesus in 431; Harmonius, who took part in a synod that Patriarch Menas of Constantinople held in 536 to condemn the Miaphysite Patriarch Anthimus I of Constantinople; Melchisedec, who participated in the Second Council of Nicaea (787).

The bishopric continued to be a see of the Greek Orthodox Church until after the 1923 population exchange between Greece and Turkey. Le Quien mentions three of those bishops who lived in the 14th and 15th centuries. Beginning in the early 13th century, there were also Latin Church bishops of Callipolis.

No longer a residential bishopric, Callipolis is today listed by the Catholic Church as a titular see.

=== Known bishops ===
- Cyrillus fl. 431
- Harmonius fl. 538
- Melchisedec fl. 787
- Joseph
- Paulus
- Alexius

==== Titular Catholic bishops ====
- Heinrich Kratz, O.Hosp.S.J.H., appointed 28 Jan 1484
- Edward, appointed 1494
- Diego, appointed 21 Aug 1507; died 1509
- John Young, ordained bishop 3 Jul 1513; died 28 Mar 1526
- Petrus Deodato, O.F.M., appointed 13 Feb 1638; succeeded as Bishop of Sardica (Sredek, Sofia), 15 Jun 1641
- James Smith, appointed 28 Jan 1688; died 13 May 1711
- Hyacinthus Archiopoli, appointed 1757; died 7 Apr 1789
- Giuseppe Menditto, appointed 23 Jun 1828
- John Bernard Fitzpatrick, appointed 21 Nov 1843; succeeded as Bishop of Boston, Massachusetts, 11 Aug 1846
- Jean-Benoît Truffet, C.S.Sp., appointed 11 Dec 1846; died 23 Nov 1847
- Jean-René Bessieux, C.S.Sp., appointed 20 Jun 1848; died 30 Apr 1876
- Rosario Maria Frungillo, appointed 31 Dec 1877; died 5 Feb 1886
- Vincenzo Molo, appointed 20 Sep 1887; died 15 Mar 1904
- Karel Wisnar, appointed 14 Nov 1904; died 18 Apr 1926
- José María Betanzos y Hormaechevarría, O.F.M., appointed 17 Jul 1926; died 27 Dec 1948
- Joseph-Pierre-Albert Wittebols, S.C.I., appointed 10 Mar 1949; appointed Bishop of Wamba 10 Nov 1959
- Bernard Schilling, S.V.D., appointed 19 Dec 1959; died 16 Jun 1992

== Gelibolu today ==
Gelibolu is now an administrative center in the province of Çanakkale. The mayor was Münir Mustafa Özacar (CHP) until the 2024 Turkish local elections, being replaced by Ali Kamil Soyuak (AKP). Gelibolu is well known for sardine canning.

== Notable people ==
- Piri Reis (c. 1465–1555), Turkish cartographer and geographer
- Hayreddin Barbarossa (1478–1546), Ottoman corsair and admiral of the Ottoman Navy.
- Ahmed Bican Yazıcıoğlu (d. c. 1466), Bayramiye dervish and writer
- Mustafa Âlî (1541–1600), Turkish historian
- Sofia Vembo (1910–1978), Greek singer
- Berkim Tumers, Archer

== See also ==
- Gallipoli Serbs
