= Dürr-i Meknûn =

15th-century Ottoman Turkish cosmography

Dürr-i Meknûn (The Hidden Pearl(s)) is a 15th-century Ottoman Turkish cosmography in prose, traditionally attributed to Ahmed Bican. It is a compilation of highly divergent material, arranged in a time running from the "time before time" to the aftermath of the Apocalypse. Metamorphosis constitutes a dominant theme: against a background of cosmic transformation take place many sorts of changes in shape and content.

== Importance ==
The first half of the 15th century had been crucial in the development of the Turkish language. This makes the Dürr-i Meknûn, with its volume and its varied subject matter, an important source for early Ottoman culture and language. The book was deliberately written by Bican for the common people in the vernacular Turkish and he strongly advocated against the widespread use among the learned elite of Arabic and Persian. Over a hundred surviving manuscript copies (it never appeared in print) testify to its popularity well into the 19th century.

== Authorship and dating ==
Dürr-i Meknûn, an anonymous work, is usually attributed to Ahmed Bican. Linguistic analysis and a comparison to other works known to be from his hand seem to consolidate this tradition. Its autograph is unknown and might have been lost at some date.

The year of writing is unclear. Stéphane Yerasimos, assuming an eschatological mood in the work triggered by the Turkish conquest of Constantinople, dates the book shortly after 1453. The Dutch scholar Laban Kaptein, however, disputes this claim after a minute analysis of the work's End Times contents.

== Synopsis ==
Bican has divided the work in 18 chapters, analogous to the 18,000 worlds created by God.

Chapter 1: On the heavens, the Throne, the Throne(-heaven), the Tablet and Pen, Heaven and Hell, the Moon, The Sun and the stars, and the cherubs

Chapter 2: On the respective Earths and their marvels, the creatures living thereon, and on the Hell

Chapter 3: About the Earth's surface and the creatures thereon

Chapter 4: On the science of geodesy ("handasa"), on climate zones and the days and the hours

Chapter 5: On marvelous mountains

Chapter 6: On the seas and the islands and their great variety of creatures

Chapter 7: On cities, mosques, cloisters and climate zones (Among other tales, the Turkish foundation legend of Istanbul, coined here by Bican)

Chapter 8: On marvelous mosques and cloisters

Chapter 9: About Süleyman’s (Solomon's) throne

Chapter 10: About the Throne of Bilqis, and her visit to Süleyman

Chapter 11: On the duration of life (The science of physiognomy ("firasa") also receives a short treatment in this chapter)

Chapter 12: On places destroyed by God's wrath

Chapter 13: On the properties of plants, fruits and stones according to the Doctores

Chapter 14: On figures, statues; some stories on cities

Chapter 15: On birds, among them the Simurg

Chapter 16: On the occult science of jafr; on what goes on in this World and the Other World; on the secret signs of jafr (jafr: Islamic numerology, compare also ‘kabbalah’)

Chapter 17: On the Signs of Judgement Day

Chapter 18: On the End Time; some sermons

== Literature ==
- Laban Kaptein, Eindtijd en Antichrist (ad-dağğâl) in de islam. Eschatologie bij Ahmed Bîcân († ca. 1466). Leiden 1997. ISBN 90-73782-90-2 (contains facsimile of Chapter 17, manuscript Leiden, Universiteitsbibliotheek Leiden, Cod. Or. 1301, with topic by topic analysis and translation in Dutch)
- Laban Kaptein, Ahmed Bican Yazıcıoğlu, Dürr-i meknûn. Kritische Edition mit Kommentar. Asch 2007. ISBN 978-90-902140-8-5
- Jan Schmidt, review of Kaptein 2007, Bibliotheca Orientalis LXIV 5-6 2007: 793–797.
- Stéphane Yerasimos, Légendes d’empire. La foundation de Constantinople et de Sainte-Sophie dans les traditions turques. Parijs 1990. ISBN 2-906053-15-5
